= List of Egged bus routes in Israel =

The Egged Transportation is the largest bus company in Israel, and one of the largest in the world. It operates over 400 bus lines, including internal city lines in many of Israel's cities (in others, the Dan Bus Company, Kavim, Superbus, etc. operate the internal lines), as well as most of Israel's inter-city lines. Below is a list.

While there is no consistent numbering scheme for Egged's lines, it seems to follow a few basic rules:

- Internal lines, and intercity lines in rural areas, are numbered below 100
- Short inter-city and suburban lines are numbered 100–299
- Long-distance lines are numbered 300–999, following some basic rules:
  - 300–399 is for lines that operate in the Southern District (and some northern lines).
  - 400–499 is for lines that operate in the Jerusalem District (and some northern lines).
  - 500–699 were used to lines in the Sharon area (and still in use for very few northern lines). The lines in the Sharon were short-distance lines. All lines that were in the Sharon region were transferred to other bus operators such as Kavim and Metropoline.
  - 700–899 is for lines that connect the Northern District to more southern parts of Israel.
  - 900–999 is for lines that connect the Haifa District and surrounding areas to more southern parts of Israel.

Each bus line is classified by Egged as 'Regular' (measef), 'Express' or 'Direct' (yashir). The word measef literally means collecting, i.e. the bus either enters each town it passes, or stops at almost every intersection along its route, which usually makes it very slow compared to express buses. Express and direct buses are usually on long-distance routes and might travel at certain sections along the same stretch as other bus routes, but they do not stop at each intersection. On top of that, an express/direct bus is not obligated to pick up short-distance passengers and the driver cannot sell a ticket for a short ride along his route. The express/direct lines are not usually pure non-stop routes, but might have a minimal number of stops while leaving and entering the different cities. All internal city buses are considered regular/collecting.

Many if not most of Egged's intercity bus lines originate or end in a central bus station/terminal (CBS/CBT). Tel Aviv Central Bus Station is the largest terminal in Israel, and some say the largest in the world.

As previously mentioned, some intercity lines in rural areas are numbered below 100. Those lines are included in the "internal" sections for the large city that they begin or end in. When the bus enters a new municipality, the name of the municipality is bolded.

Some lines may have one or more 'alternative routes' (halufa, lit. 'alternative'), in which one or few trips a day will follow a slightly different route instead of the usual one.

Certain lines use armoured buses. Those lines are marked with a small tank icon.

== Intracity and Areal ==
=== Eilat ===
Line	Route	
1/1א	(Circular route) Eilat CBS – Sports center (1א only) Dan Panorama Hotel – Shahamon neighborhood – Mitzpe Yam neighborhood – Ye'elim neighborhood – Dan Panorama Hotel – Sports center (1א only) – Eilat CBS	
2	Eilat CBS – Dan Panorama Hotel – Ye'elim neighborhood – Mitzpe Yam neighborhood – Shahamon neighborhood – Dan Panorama Hotel – Eilat CBS	
3	Shahamon neighborhood – Yoseftal Hospital – Yotam Road – City Center – Hativat Golani blvd. - Industrual Area – Egged Garage	
4	Shahamon neighborhood – Derech HaTavlinim – Yoseftal Hospital – Arava neighborhood – Ye'elim neighborhood – Industrial Area – Egged Garage	
5/5א	Shahamon neighborhood – Mitzpe Yam neighborhood – Urim neighborhood – Eilat CBS – North Beach hotels – Neve Midbar neighborhood (5א and 6א only) – New Industrial Area - Egged Garage	Return route labeled 6/6א
10	Night Line. New industrial area – Mitzpe Yam neighborhood – Shahamon neighborhood – Mall HaYam – North Beach Hotels – New industrial area	
11	Night Line. New industrial area – North Beach Hotels – Mall HaYam – Shahamon neighborhood – Mitzpe Yam neighborhood – New industrial area	
15/16	Eilat CBS – Ophira Park – North beach hotels - Mall HaYam – Dolphinarium – Coral Beach – Underwater Observatory – Taba Border Crossing	Return route labeled 16
30	Taba Border Crossing - Underwater Observatory - Coral Beach - Mall HaYam - Eilat CBS - Eylot kibbutz - Shchoret Industrial Area - Ramon International Airport	
31	Eilat CBS - Mitzpe Yam neighborhood - Ye'elim neighborhood - Eylot kibbutz - Shchoret Industrial Area - Ramon International Airport	
32	Shahamon neighborhood - Eylot kibbutz - Shchoret Industrial Area - Ramon International Airport	
50/50א	Eilat CBS - Mall HaYam - Ophira Park - North beach hotels - Eylot kibbutz - Shchoret Industrial Area - Ramon International Airport	Return route labeled 50א

Map of Egged bus lines in Eilat (Hebrew) |-

=== Haifa and Krayot ===
==== Haifa, Tirat Karmel and Nesher ====
Line	Route	Notes/Additional Information
1	Hof Ha'Carmel CBS – Ziv – Technion. (Rush Hours Only)	
3	Hof Ha'Carmel CBS – Neve David – West Carmel – Carmel Center – Ramat Hadar – Hadar – Downtown – Ein Ha'yam – Kiryat Sprinzak	
6	Government compound – Downtown – Tel Amal – East Carmel – Bahá'í Gardens – Stella Maris – HaTzionut – Hertzaliya – Geula	
7	HaMifratz CBS – Nesher	
8	Bat Galim – Kiryat Eliezer – German Colony – Lower Bahá'í Gardens – Hadar – Geula – German Colony – Bat Galim (Circular, Shabbat afternoons only)	
9/9א	Ziv Center – Ramat Hen – Ramot Sapir – Ramat Remez – Ziv Center (circular)	
10	Government compound – Center HaShmona Railway Station – German Colony – Lower Bahá'í Gardens – Hadar – Geula – Center HaShmona Railway Station- Government compound (Circular)	
11	Hof Ha'Carmel CBS – Ramat Eshkol – Horev Center – Rommema – Ziv – Technion	
12/12א	Government compound – Center HaShmona Railway Station – German Colony – Lower Bahá'í Gardens – Hadar – Carmel Center – Ahuza – Horev Center – Carmel Hospital	
13	Halisa – Neve Yoseph – Tel Amal – Hadar – Government compound – Linn Clinic – Rambam Hospital – Bat Galim	
14	Bat Galim – Rambam Hospital – Linn Clinic – German Colony – Government compound – Hadar – Tel Amel – Neve Sha'anan – Ziv – Remez – Neve Sha'anan – Yizraelia – Tel Amel – Hadar – Government compound – German Colony – Linn Clinic – Rambam Hospital – Bat Galim. (Circular, Shabbat afternoons only)	
15	Ziv Center – Neve Sha'anan – Yizraelia – Yad La'Banim road – Halisa – Hadar – Government compound – Linn Clinic – Rambam Hospital – Bat Galim	
16	HaMifratz CBS – via Tunnels – Grand Canyon – Ziv Center – Geula – Hadar – Government compound – Linn Clinic – Rambam Hospital – Bat Galim	
17	Technion – Ziv Center – Neve Sha'anan – Halisa – Downtown – Government compound – Center HaShmona Railway Station – Linn Clinic – Rambam Hospital – Bat Galim – Hof Ha'Carmel CBS	
18/18א	Neve Sha'anan – Ziv Center – Yad La'Banim road – Hadar – Downtown – Linn Clinic – Rambam Hospital – Bat Galim	
19/19א	Technion – Ziv Center – Neve Sha'anan – Neve Yosef – Hadar. 19a continues to Linn Clinic – Rambam Hospital – Bat Galim. (Evenings Only)	
20	Ziv Center – Ramat Alon – Ramat Remez – Ziv Center (circular)	
21	Carmel Hospital – Horev Center – Akhuza – Carmel Center – Elishema Hospital – Bnei Tzion Hospital – Hadar – Linn Clinic – Bat Galim Old CBS	
23/23א	HaMifratz CBS – (via Tunnel) – Grand Canyon – New Romema – Horev Center – Carmel Center – Ha'Tziyonut St' – Ha'Neviim St' – German Colony – Linn Clinic – Bat Galim – Hof Ha'Carmel CBS. (Shabbat afternoons only)	
24	Hof Ha'Carmel CBS – Bat Galim CBS – Downtown – Hadar – Geula – Old Romema – New Romema – Horev Center – University of Haifa	
25	Hadar – French Carmel – Ramat Shaul – Kiryat Shprinzak	
27	HaMifratz CBS – Nesher – Yagur – Kiryat Ata	
28	Grand Canyon – Neve Sha'anan – Ziv Center – Horev Center – Carmel Center -Bnai Zion Hospital – Hadar – German Colony – Linn Clinic – Bat Galim CBS	
29	Hof Ha'Carmel CBS – Ramat Eshkol – Horev Center – Ramat Bagin – Horev Center – Hantke St' – Einstein St' – Horev Center – Carmel Hospital – Ramat Eshkol – Hof Ha'Carmel CBS (circular)	
30/30א	Kiryat Sprinzak – Ramat Shaul – Tshernihovski St' – Carmel Center. 30 continues to Horev Center, University of Haifa.	
31	Bat Galim – Rambam Hospital – Ein HaYam – Kiryat Shprinzak – Ramat Shaul – Carmel Center – Carmel Hospital – Ziv – Technion	
33	Carmel Center – Carmeliya – Carmel Center (circular)	
34	Carmel Center – Kababir – Carmel Center (circular)	
35	Carmel Center – West Carmel – Kiryat Shprintzak – Hof Ha'Carmel CBS (Shabbat afternoons only)	
36	University of Haifa – Ramat Remez – Ziv Center – Neve Sha'anan – Neve Yosef – Hadar	
37/37א	Bat Galim CBS – Hadar – Carmel Center – Horev Center – University of Haifa. 37א continues to Isfiya and Daliyat Al-Karmel	
38		
39	University of Haifa – Denya – University of Haifa	
40/40א	HaMifratz CBS – HaGiborim – Neve Ganim – Neve Paz – Hadar – Linn Clinic – Rambam Hospital – Bat Galim	
41	Tel Amal – Nachala – Hadar – Messada street – HaTzionut – Hadar – Nachala – Tal Amal (Circular)	
42	Kishon Port – Shemen Beach – Neve Ganim – Neve Paz – Hadar – Linn Clinic – Rambam Hospital – Bat Galim	Return route is labeled 42א
43	Hof Ha'Carmel CBS – Neot Peres – Neve David – Sha'ar Aliya – Ein HaYam – Kiryat Eliezer – Linn Clinic – Rambam Hospital – Bat Galim	
44	Tirat Carmel – Neot Peres – Horev Center – Grand Canyon	
45	Tirat Carmel – Hof Ha'Carmel CBS. (Rush Hours Only)	
47	Tirat Carmel – Hof Ha'Carmel CBS.	
49	Tirat Carmel – Hof Ha'Carmel CBS.	
51	Grand Canyon – Romema – Vardia – Carmel Center – West Carmel – Sha'ar HaAliya – Kiryat Sprinzak – Ein Ha'yam – Bat Galim CBS – Center HaShmona Railway Station – Kirat Ha'Mamshela	
54	Hof Ha'Carmel CBS – University of Haifa – Isfiya – Daliyat Al-Karmel	
70	HaMifratz CBS – Nesher	
71	HaMifratz CBS – Nesher	
72/72א		
74	HaMifratz CBS - Nesher - Ibtin - Khawaled - Ras Ali	
76	Grand Canyon – Technion – Nesher – Yagur	
77	Grand Canyon – Technion – Nesher – Yagur	
78	HaMifratz CBS – Nesher	
79	HaMifratz CBS – Nesher. (Evenings only)	
100	HaMifratz CBS – Haifa Airport	
110	Tirat Carmel – Matam – Ein HaYam – Allenby Rd. – German Colony – Hadar – HaGiborim – Nesher – Rechasim – Kfar Hasidim	
112	Hof Ha'Carmel CBS – Neve David – Sha'ar HaAliya – Ein HaYam – Allenby Rd. – German Colony – Rambam Hospital – Hadar – Tel Amel – Nesher	
115	HaMifratz CBS – HaGiborim st. – Hadar – Ramat Shaul – Kiryat Shprintsak – Hof Ha'Carmel CBS	
123	Hof Ha'Carmel CBS – Freud Rd. – Horev Center – Ziv Center – Neve Sha'anan – Neve Yosef – HaMifratz CBS	
125	Grand Canyon – Neve Sha'anan – Neve Yosef – HaMifratz CBS	
131	Carmel Hospital – Horev Center – Moria – Freud Rd. – Horev Center – Carmel Center – Bnai Zion Hospital – Ha'Giborim Street – HaMifratz CBS. (Rush Hours Only)	
132	Hof Ha'Carmel CBS – Freud Rd. – Carmel Hospital – Horev Center – Carmel Center – Bnai Zion Hospital – Ha'Giborim Street – HaMifratz CBS	
133	Hof Ha'Carmel CBS – Freud Rd. – Horev Center – Carmel Center – Bnai Zion Hospital – Ha'Giborim Street – HaMifratz CBS	
136	Kiryat Ata Junction – HaMifratz CBS – (via Tunnel) – Grand Canyon – New Romema – Horev Center – Carmel Center – Hadar – German Colony – Linn Clinic – Rambam Hospital – Bat Galim	
137	University of Haifa – Horev – Romema – Grand Canyon – Kiryat Haim – Kiryat Yam	
142	Technion – Ziv – HaMifratz CBS	
144	University of Haifa – Horev – Ramat Remez – Ziv – Technion – Neve Sha'anan – Grand Canyon – Kiryat Ata	
145	University of Haifa – Technion – Grand Canyon – Kiryat Haim – Kiryat Bialik – Kiryat Motzkin	
146	HaMifratz CBS – Nesher – University of Haifa – Horev Center – Hof Ha'Carmel CBS	
148	Tirat Carmel – Matam – Ein HaYam – Allenby Rd. – German Colony – Hadar – Grand Canyon – University of Haifa	
217		An express version of line 17. Few trips per day.
224		An express version of line 24. Few trips per day.
236	Carmel Center – Carmelia – Moria – Carmel Hospital – Horev Center – Romema – Government compound – Center Railway Station (Rush Hours Only)	
245	Tirat Carmel – Matam – Ein HaYam – Kiryat Eliezer – German Colony – Government compound – Hadar (Shabbat only)	

==== Krayot and Rekhasim ====
Line	Route	Notes/Additional Information
11	(Bi directional circular route) Merkazit HaKrayot - Kiryat Yam - Kiryat Motzkin, City Hall - Tsabar Junction - Kiryat Bialik, HaKiryon - Zur Shalom - Merkazit HaKrayot	Bi directional circular route
12	Merkazit HaKrayot - Kiryat Yam - Kiryat Motzkin, Old Motzkin - Goshen blvd. - Mozart Junction - Kiryat Bialik, Bialik Darom - Sabinia - HaKiryon - HaParpar - Givat HaRakafot	
12	Rekhasim local route.	
13		
14	Kiryat Bialik local route. Merkazit HaKrayout - Zur Shalom - Neot Afek - HaKiryon - Sabinia - Bialik Darom - Haifa, Halutzei HaTaasiya - Krayot Egged Garage	
15		
18		
21	Hutzot HaMifratz - Kiryat Ata Junction - Kiryat Ata, Ikea - Zevulun - City Center - Kiryat Binyamin - Neve Avraham	
22/22א		
23		
24		
25		
26		
29	Kiryat Ata - Rekhasim	Return route labelled as line 30
52	Merkazit HaKrayot - Kiryat Motzkin, Neve Ganim - Mishkanot HaOmanim - Chai Park - City Hall - Jabotinsky - Goshen blvd. - Mozart Junction - Haifa, HaHistadrut blvd. - Halutzei HaTaasiya - Krayot Egged Garage	
66	Kiryat Ata - Usha - Ramat Yochanan	

==== Night lines ====
These lines run every night. Official Egged website page about night lines

Line	Route
200	Dado Beach (next to Hof Ha'Carmel CBS and Haifa Hof HaCarmel Railway Station) – Western Carmel – Carmel Center – Horev Center – University of Haifa – Technion – Ziv Center – Neve Sha'anan – Hadar – German Colony – Downtown – Checkpost Junction – Kiryat Motzkin Junction – Kiryat Haim
205	Center Railway Station – German Colony – Hadar – Carmel Center – French Carmel – Kiryat Shprinzak – Sha'ar HaAliya – Matam – Tirat Carmel
208	Bat Galim – Rambam Hospital – Linn Clinic – German Colony – Hadar – Carmel Center – Carmel Hospital – Horev Center – Romema – Ziv – Nesher – Lev HaMifratz – Kiryat Haim
210	Kiryon – Tzur Shalom – Kiryat Yam – Kiryat Motzkin – Kiryat Bialik – Kiryat Haim – INS Eilat – Chalutzei HaTa'asiya – Kiryat Ata – Givat Ram & Givat Tal

=== Hadera, Pardes Hana Karkur and Zichron Yaacov ===
==== Hadera ====
Line	Route
6	(Circular route) CBS – Elram – Pe'er – Nakhliel – CBS
7	(Circular route) CBS – Beitar – Weizman – Giv'at Olga – Weizman – Beitar – CBS
8/8א	CBS – Beitar – Ganei Alon – West Railway Station – Hillel Yaffe Medical Center – Hefziba
9	(Circular route) CBS – Industrial Area – CBS
10	East Railway Station – Mixx Shopping Center – Weizman – West Railway Station – Mall HaHof Village – Hillel Yaffe Medical Center
11/11א	(Circular route) CBS – Pe'er – Bialik – Brandeis – Nisan – CBS
12	CBS – Yoseftal – Beit Eliezer
13	Beit Eliezer – City Center – CBS – Neve Haim – Giv'at Olga
14	CBS – Yoseftal – Beit Eliezer
15	New Beit Eliezer – Denya – Yoseftal – Beitar – West Railway Station - Mall HaHof Village – Giv'at Olga – Ein HaYam
16	New Beit Eliezer – Park Neighbourhood – Nissan – Bialik – West Railway Station
18	Ein HaYam – Giv'at Olga – Railway Station
20	Mixx Shopping Center - Nakhliel - HaOtsar - West Railway Station - Mall HaHof VIllage
22	Brandeis – CBS – Beitar – West Railway Station – Weizman – Neve Haim – Hillel Yaffe Medical Center

==== Pardes Hana Karkur ====
Line	Route	Notes
1	Neot Yuvalim – Neve Efrayim – LaMerhav rd. – Local Council – Hadarim St. – Pardes Hana Railway Station	
2/2א	Pardes Hana Railway Station – Hadarim St. – Local Council – Shikun Hcisachon – Neve Efrayim – Omarim	Return route labeled as line 2א
3	(Circular route) BIG Center – Alonim School – LaMerhav rd. – Amidar – Neve Ganim – LaMerhav rd. – Local Council – BIG Center	
4	Neot Yuvalim – Shikun Olim A – Karkur – Neve Oved – Shikun Olim B – HaBanim rd. – Alonim School – LaMerhav rd. – Pardes Hana Railway Station	
5/5א	BIG Center – Alonim School – LaMerhav rd. – Neve Pardesim – Shikun Remez – Ma'on LaOved – Neve Merhav – Amidar – Pardes Hana Railway Station	Return route labeled as line 5א
28		Limited frequency
33		Limited frequency
34	BIG Center – Alonim School – Local council – Mishmarot – Shikun Olim A – Karkur – Ein Iron – Kfar Pines – Karkur - Shikun Olim A – Mishmarot – Alonim School – Local council – BIG Center	

==== Zichron Yaakov ====
Line	Route	Notes
1	(Circular route) Local council – Pisgat Zichron Mall – Neve Sharet – Halompt Zichron – Pisgat Zichron Mall – Zichron Yaakov local council	
2/3	Givat Eden – Neve Shalev – Local council – Nili School – HaKovshim st. – Pisgat Zichron Mall – Halomot Zichron – HaHita School	Return route labeled 3

=== Jerusalem ===
Line	Route	Notes/Additional Information
4	Har Homa – Tunnels Junction – Gilo	
5	Jerusalem College of Engineering – Ramat Beit HaKerem – Yefeh Nof Light Rail station – Sha'arei Zedek Medical Center- Givat Mordechai – Patt Intersection – Malha Mall – Talpiot – Har Homa	
6/6א	Jerusalem CBS – Begin Expressway – Givat Mordechai – Patt Intersection – Malha Mall – Malha Railway Station	
7	Givat Ram – Science Museum – Knesset/Israel Museum – Supreme Court – Bezalel St. – Kikar HaDavidka – King George St. – Keren HaYesod St. – Derech Hevron (southbound) – Derech Beit Lehem (northbound) – Arnona – Ramat Rachel	
8	(Circular route) Talpiyot - Katamon – HaRakevet Rd - Bethlehem Rd - King David St. - Keren Hayesod St. – Talbiya - The German Colony - Katamon – Talpiyot	
9	Givat Mordechai – Neve Sha'anan – Science Museum – Givat Ram (Hebrew University) – Israel Museum – Rehavia – Bezalel St. – Elyash St. – Yishayahu St. (eastbound) – Bukharim (Tzfanya/Nehemia Sts.) – Kiryat Sanz – Kiryat Mattersdorf – Mekor Baruch (northbound) – Jerusalem CBS	
10	Har Herzl Light Rail station – Kiryat HaYovel – Golomb St. – Katamonim – Yochanan Ben Zakai St. – Talpiot	
12	East Talpiot – Haas Promenade – Talpiot – Patt Intersection – Malha Mall – Malha – Givat Masua – Ir Ganim – Kiryat Menachem – Hadassah Hospital-Ein Kerem	
14	Jerusalem CBS – Supreme Court – Knesset/Israel Museum – Givat Ram (Hebrew University) – Knesset/Israel Museum – Rassco – Katamon – Emek Refaim – Yochanan Ben Zakai St. – Patt Intersection – Malha Railway Station – Malha Mall	
15	Jerusalem CBS – Ben Tzvi Street – Rassco – San Simon – Yochanan Ben Zakai St. – Talpiot	
16	Ha’arazim central bus terminal – Sanhedria – Kiryat Sanz – Kiryat Mattersdorf – Romema Illit – Givat Shaul (Route 16) – Kiryat Moshe (Route 16) – Herzl Blvd. (Route 16) – Har Herzl & Yad Vashem (Route 16) – Bayit Vegan (Route 16)	
17	Givat Masua – Malha – Malha Mall – Herzog St. – Gaza Street – Rehavia – King George St. – Kikar HaDavidka (southbound) – HaNevi’im St. – Sheikh Jarrah – Mount Scopus/Hebrew University	Revised route to Hebrew U started April 1, 2011
18	Jerusalem CBS – Agripas St. – Kikar HaDavidka – King George St. (Southbound) – Keren HaYesod (Southbound) – Hanevi'im St.(Northobund) – City Hall (Northbound) – King David St. (Northbound) – Emek Refaim – Yossi ben Yo’ezer St. – Katamonim – Malha Mall – Malha Railway Station	
19/19א	Hadassah Hospital-Ein Kerem – Kfar Salma (Route 19) – Kiryat Menachem (Route 19א) – Kiryat HaYovel – Golomb St. – Herzog St. – Gaza Street – Rehavia – Bezalel St. – King George St. – Hanevi'im St. – Bar Lev Blvd. – Mount Scopus/Hebrew University	Northbound Route 19א operates from Haddasah Hospital-Ein Kerem to Mount Scopus/Hebrew University via Kiryat Menachem. Southbound Route 19א operates from Mount Scopus/Hebrew University to the center of town, the last stop is at Ben Yehuda and King George streets. Limited Route 19 service operates each morning from Gilo to Hadassah Hospital-Ein Kerem, following a path similar to Route 32 until Patt Intersection, and then following the regular Route 19 path.
20	Givat Masua – Ir Ganim – Kiryat Menachem – Kiryat HaYovel – Har Herzl Light Rail station	
21	Ramat Sharett – Holyland (Route 21א) – Bayit Vegan – Har Herzl & Yad Vashem – Yefeh Nof Light Rail station	
22/22א	Talpiot (Egged Garage) – Patt – Katamonim – San Simon – Rassco – Gaza St. – King George St. – Straus St. – Yehezkiel St. – Ma'alot Dafna – Ramat Eshkol – Pisgat Ze'ev	There are two separate Route 22א services. One operates northbound only along the same path as Route 22 from Talpiot to the intersection of Straus and Street of the Prophets (HaNevi’im) and then continues to Shlomzion HaMalka. The other is used as the designation for southbound Route 22 trips that terminate at King George Street in front of the Mashbir.
23	Har Herzl Light Rail station – Bayit Vegan – Kiryat HaYovel – Ir Ganim	
24	Har Herzl Light Rail station – Kiryat HaYovel	
26	Har Herzl Light Rail station – Bayit Vegan – Ramat Sharett – Ramat Denya – Kiryat HaYovel	
27/27א	central Station - hezl rd - Har Herzl Light Rail station – Kiryat HaYovel – Kfar Salma – Hadassah Hospital-Ein Kerem – Even Sapir (Route 27א)	
28/28א	Ramat Beit HaKerem – Yefeh Nof Light Rail station – Har Herzl & Yad Vashem – Ein Kerem – Ein Kerem Agricultural School	
29	Har Herzl Light Rail station – Kiryat HaYovel – Kiryat Menachem – Ir Ganim – Givat Masua	Route number was changed from 13א to 29 on February 21, 2014
30	(Circular route) Gilo – Tunnels Junction – Talpiot – Tunnels Junction – Gilo	
30א	Mount Scopus/Hebrew University – Bar Lev Blvd. – Kikar Safra – King David St. – Derech Hevron – Talpiot – Tunnels Junction – Gilo	
33	Har Nof – Kfar Shaul – Givat Shaul – Kiryat Moshe – Herzl Blvd. – Har Herzl & Yad Vashem – Bayit Vegan – Ramat Sharett – Biblical Zoo – Malha Mall – Gilo	Evening service bypasses the Biblical Zoo and serves Malha instead
34	Mount Scopus/Hebrew University – Ammunition Hill Light Rail – Yehezkel St. – Straus St. – King George St. – Keren HaYesod – Emek Refaim – Talpiot – Givat HaMatos (Route 34א)	
35	Malha Mall – Malha – Kiryat HaYovel – Bayit Vegan – Har Herzl Light Rail station – Yefeh Nof Light Rail station – Kiryat Moshe (Southbound) – Givat Ram (Hebrew University) – Knesset/Israel Museum – Supreme Court	
39/39א	Bayit Vegan – Har Herzl & Yad Vashem – Shaare Zedek Medical Center – Begin Expressway – Jerusalem CBS – Malkhei Yisrael St. – Straus St. – Yehezkel St. – Bar Ilan Junction (northbound) – Ma'alot Dafna (southbound) (Route 39) – Ramat Eshkol (Route 39) – Sanhedria – Ha’arazim central bus terminal	Route 39א operates northbound only from Bayit Vegan to Har Hotzvim
42/42א	Hadassah Hospital-Ein Kerem – Kfar Salma – Kiryat HaYovel – Givat Ram (Hebrew University) – Begin Expressway (Route 42) – Yigael Yadin (Route 42) – French Hill (Route 42) – Mount Scopus/Hebrew University (Route 42)	
50	(Circular route) Jerusalem College of Engineering – Ramat Beit HaKerem – Denia Square Light Rail station – He-'Haluts Light Rail station – Kiryat Moshe – Jerusalem CBS – Kiryat Moshe – He-'Haluts Light Rail station – Ramat Beit HaKerem – Yefeh Nof Light Rail station – Ramat Beit HaKerem – Jerusalem College of Engineering	
80	Gilo (Circular route)	
88	East Talpiot only	
111		
150	Jerusalem Har Herzl Light Rail station Kiryat Yovel – Ora – Amminadav	

==== Night lines ====
During the summer months (July and August), the night lines run every night except Friday night, due to Shabbat. Throughout the year, these lines run only on Thursday and Saturday, and also during Chol Hamoed Pesach and Sukkot, Hanukkah, New Year's, Yom Haatzmaut, and Purim.

Line	Route
102	Jerusalem CBS – Agripas St. (outbound) – HaNevi’im St. – Shlomzion HaMalka (outbound) – King David St. – Emek Refaim – Talpiot – Tunnels Junction – Gilo
103	Talpiot – Emek Refaim – Keren Hayesod (outbound) – King George St. (outbound) – King David St. (inbound) – Shlomzion HaMalka – Bar Lev Blvd. – French Hill Junction (outbound) – Pisgat Ze'ev – Neve Yaakov
106	Jerusalem CBS – Agripas St. (outbound) – HaNevi’im St. – Shlomzion HaMalka (outbound) – King David St. – Emek Refaim – Talpiot – Patt Intersection – Kiryat HaYovel – Kiryat Menachem – Ir Ganim – Givat Masua
107	Jerusalem CBS – Agripas St. (outbound) – HaNevi’im St. – Shlomzion HaMalka (outbound) – King David St. – Derech Hevron – Haas Promenade – East Talpiot – Har Homa
108	Talpiot – Emek Refaim – King David St. – Shlomtzion HaMalka – King George St. (outbound) – HaNevi’im St. (inbound) – Agripas St. (inbound) – Jerusalem CBS – Begin Expressway – Ramot

=== Kiryat Shmona ===
Line	Route
3/3א	Southwest neighborhood – BIG Center – Southern indust. area – HaYarden st. – CBS
4/4א	(Circular route) CBS – Shapira – HaVradim
5/5א	CBS – Shapira – Nof Hermon – HaEtsel – Moradot Har Naftali – Igal Alon – CBS
10	(Circular route) CBS - Tel Hai College - CBS
11	BIG Center – Southwest neighborhood – CBS – HaVradim – North indust. area
12	BIG Center – South indust. area – HaYarden st. – CBS – Nof Hermon – HaEtsel – Igal Alon – North indust. area

==== Areal buses in the Galilee Panhandle ====
Line	Route	Notes
20	(Circular route) Kiryat Shmona, Tel Hai, Metulla	
24	Kiryat Shmona, Tel Hai, Kfar Giladi, Misgav Am, Margaliot, Manara	
30	Tel Hai, Kiryat Shmona, Kfar Blum, Sde Nehemia, Amir, Shamir, Kfar Szold	Some trips does not pass in Kfar Blum
32	Kiryat Shmona, Gome Junc., Kfar Blum, Neot Mordechai, Lehavot HaBashan, Gonen	
35	Tel Hai, Kiryat Shmona, Beit Hillel, HaGoshrim, Sha'ar Yeshuv, Dafna	
36	Kiryat Shmona, Tel Hai, Kfar Yuval, Ma'ayan Baruch, HaGoshrim, Dafna, Dan, Snir	

=== Karmiel ===
Line	Route
1/1א	(Circular route) Industrial Area – BIG Center – Railway station – HaMeyasdim – Municipal pool – Stadium – HaArava – Lev Karmiel Mall – HaIrusim – Givat Makosh
2	Industrial Area – BIG Center – Nesie'i Y'Israel blvd. – Lev Karmiel Mall – HaGalil – Megadim – Tene – Railway station
3	(Circular route) Industrial Area – BIG Center – Railway station – Nesie'i Y'Israel blvd. – Lev Karmiel Mall – Mota Gur Interchange – Givat Ram
4	(Circular route) Industrial Area – BIG Center – Railway station – Nesie'i Y'Israel blvd. – Lev Karmiel Mall – Ramat Rabin
5	Circular route) Industrial Area – BIG Center – Railway station – Tene – Sagi – Lev Karmiel Mall – HaGalil Park
6	(Circular route) BIG Center – Railway station – HaMeyasdim – Municipal pool – Stadium – HaArava – HaIrusim – Lev Karmiel Mall – HaGalil – Megadim – Tene – Sagi – HaGalil
7	(Circular route) BIG Center – Railway station – HaMeyasdim – Nesie'i Y'Israel blvd. – Lev Karmiel Mall – Givat Ram – Ramat Rabin – HaIrusim – Lev Karmiel Mall
8	Industrial Area – BIG Center – Railway station – Megadim – Sagi – HaGalil – Ramat Rabin – Mota Gur Interchange – Givat Ram

=== South Gush-Dan Areal bus routes ===
==== Azor, Holon, Bat-Yam, Rishon LeZion and Tel Aviv ====
Line	Route
4	Holon local route: Wolfson Hospital – Tel Giborim – Kiryat Avoda – Sokolov St. – Neve Pinchas – Industrial Area – Peres Park
5	Holon local route: Wolfson Hospital – Tel Giborim – Kiryat Avoda – Eilat St. – Jessi Cohen – Kiryat Ben Gurion – Golda Me'ir St. – Kiryat Sharet – Industrial Area – Peres Park
9	(Circular route) Ben Gurion Airport – Camp Ben Ami
12	Rishon LeZion, Old CBS – Palmachim. Via IKEA, Neta'im, Gan Sorek and Beit Hanan
15	Holon, Wolfson hospital – to Rishon LeZion, Azrieli Rishonim. Via Bat Yam.
16	Holon, Kiryat Sharet – Rishon LeZion, New CBS. via Levi Eshkol st., New Industrial Area, Moshe Dayan Railway Station, Neve Hof and Bat Yam
18/18א	Rishon LeZion – Park and Ride, to Beit Dagan
20	Holon, Wolfson hospital – Rishon LeZion, "Harishonim" train station. Via Shikun Gordon, New Industrial Area and Holon
24	Holon, Kiryat Sharet – Rishon LeZion, Park and Ride
74	Tel Aviv, Reading Terminal – Rishon LeZion, Azrieli Rishonim
87	Holon, Egged Garage – Azor, Shiv'ana neighborhood. Via Bat Yam and Holon.
88	Tel-Aviv, Carmelit Terminal – Holon, Peres Park. Via Bat-Yam.
95	Azor – Rishon LeZion – Yes Planet. Via Holon, New Industrial Area and Levi Eshkol St.
96	Tel-Aviv, Arlozorov Terminal – Azor. Via HaMasger St.
99	Azor – Holon, Egged Garage. Via Holon and Bat Yam
112	Tel Aviv, New CBS – Palmahim. Via Rishon LeZion
190	Rishon LeZion, Azrieli Rishonim – Tel Aviv, Arlozorov Terminal. Via highway 20
193	Rishon LeZion, Azrieli Rishonim – To Tel Aviv, Reading Terminal. Via highway 1
194	Rishon LeZion, Azrieli Rishonim – To Tel Aviv, Arlozorov Terminal. Via highway 44 and highway 1
222	Rishon LeZion, Azrieli Rishonim – Tel Aviv University. Via Highway 1 (One way only)
228	Rishon LeZion, Park and Drive – Lod, Ganei Aviv Rail Station. Via Be'er Yakov and Ramle
264	Rishon LeZion, Central Bus Station – Tel Aviv, Kiryat Atidim. Via Highway 4 and Bnei Brak
270	Rishon LeZion, Central Bus Station – Tel Aviv, Reading Terminal. Via Neve Eliyahu neighborhood and Highway 20
271	Tel Aviv, University – Holon, Peres Park
296	Beit Dagan – Tel Aviv, Reading Terminal. Via Azor. Night line
316	Rishon LeZion, Central Bus Station – Ramat Gan, Ayalon Mall. Via Highway 4 and Bnei Brak
374	Holon, Peres Park – Ramla, Kiryat HaOmanim
425	Rishon LeZion, Neve Hof neighborhood – Tel Aviv, Kiryat Atidim. Via Bat Yam. Night line
489	Holon, Industrial Area – Tel Aviv, Reading Terminal. Night line

==== Rishon LeZion intracity lines ====
Map of selected Egged bus lines in Rishon LeZion (Hebrew)

Line	Route	Notes
3	Old Industrual Area - Bat Yam, Sports Center	
5/5א	Malls – Neot Shikma – Neot Ashlim – Kiryat Ganim – New CBS – Old CBS – Merom Rishon – Tzrifin – Asaf HaRofe Hospital	
6	IKEA – New CBS – Kiryat Ganim – Neot Ashalim – Neot Shikma – Malls – Yes Planet – Park and Drive	
7	Old Industrial Area – Nahalat Yehuda – Ramat Eliyahu – Neot Shikma – Moshe Dayan Railway Station – Yes Planet	Return route labeled 8
11	Rishonim Railway Station – Shikoon Gordon – East – Sha'ar Rishon – Neve Hadarim – Old CBS – New CBS – Neve Yam – Malls	
14/14א	Malls – Neot Shikma – Neot Shikma – New CBS – Old CBS – Rambam – Neve Hadarim – Old Industrial Area	
17	Old Industrial Area – Nahalat Yehuda – Old CBS – New CBS – Kiryat Ganim – Neot Ashalim – Neot Shikma – Neve Dkalim – New Industrial Area – Moshe Dayan Railway Station – Neve Hof – Bat Yam, HaKomemiyut – Holon, Egged Garage	
21	Yes Planet – Moshe Dayan Railway Station – New Industrial Area – Neve Yam – Jabotinsky street – Old CBS – Sha'ar Rishon – East – Shikun Gordon – Rishonim Railway Station	
100	(Circular route) Park and Ride – Superland – New Industrial Area – New CBS – Old CBS – Neve Hadarim – Neve Ze'ev – Shamir Medical Center	
220	Neve Hof – Yes Planet – New Industrial Area – Ne'ot Shikma – Ramat Eliyahu – Nahalat Yehuda – Old Industrial Area	
221	Neve Hof – Yes Planet – New Industrial Area – Ramat Eliyahu – New CBS – Old CBS – East – Shikun Gordon – Rishonim Railway Station	

==== Rehovot, Ness Ziona and Gedera Areal bus routes ====
Line	Route
1	Gedera local route. Menachem Begin blvd. (Circular route)
2	Gedera local route. Ahuzat Gedera, to HaPoalim neighborhood
2/2א	Ness Ziona local route. Tirat Shalom – Power Center – Science Park – Rehovot Railway Station
3	Rehovot CBS (Circular route)
5/5א	Ness Ziona local route. Power Center – Shmurat Malibu – Ganei Iris – Ramat Ben Tzvi – Kenyoter – Weizmann St. – Science Park – Rehovot Railway Station
6/6א	Ness Ziona local route. Power Center – Weizmann St. – Neve Hadar – Yad Eliezer – Lev HaMoshava – Hanafat HaDegel St. – Science Park – Rehovot Railway Station
7/7א	Ness Ziona local route. Municipal Stadium – Tirat Shalom – Ganei Iris – Kenyoter – Neve Hadar – LevHaMoshava – Industrial Area – Power Center
8	Rehovot Railway Station - Kiryat HaMada - Rehovot CBS
9	Rehovot Railway Station - Ushiyot - Milchen
10/10א	Kaplan Medical Center – Weisgal Center
12	Rehovot Railway Station – Kiryat HaMada – Hertzog – Menucha VeNachala – Cemetery – Kiryat David – HaYovel – Ushiyot – Kaplan Medical Center – Bilu Center
12א	Rehovot CBS – Herzl – Rehovot Railway Station – Kiryat HaMada – Hertzog – Menucha VeNachala – Cemetery – Kiryat David – HaYovel – Ushiyot
13/13א	Rehovot CBS (Circular route)
14/14א	Weisgal Center (Circular route)
15/15א	Egged Rehovot Garage – Kiryat Moshe – Sela - Neve Alon – CBS - Herzl St. – Ushiyot – Herzl St. – CBS – Neve Alon – Sela – Kiryat Moshe – Egged Rehovot Garage (Circular route)
16/16א	Rehovot Railway Station – Kiryat HaMada – Neve Amit – Peres Academic Center – Dutch Rehovot – Kfar Gabirol – Industrial Area – Neve Yehuda – Neve Alon – CBS – Shaaraim – Kaplan Medical Center – Bilu Center
17	Kfar Gabirol – Dutch Rehovot – Peres Academic Center – Neve Amit – Rehovot Railway Station
18	Kiryat Moshe – Sela – Neve Yehuda – Weizmann Institute – Rehovot Railway Station
19	Rehovot CBS – Neve Alon – Sela – Kiryat Moshe – Kfar Gabirol – Dutch Rehovot (One way only)
24/24א	Rehovot Railway Station – Marmorek – New Rehovot – Givati (Route 24א) – Givat Brenner (Route 24) – Beit Elazari (Route 24)
26/26א	Rehovot Railway Station – Rehovot CBS – Kiryat Ekron – Mazkeret Batya – Mazkeret Batya Railway Station
27	Rehovot Railway Station – Rehovot CBS – Kiryat Ekron – Mazkeret Batya – Gani Yohanan – Yatzitz
28	Rehovot Railway Station – Rehovot CBS – Shaaraim – Bilu Junction – Na'an – Ganei Hadar – Ramot Meir
38	Rehovot CBS to Yesodot via Kiryat Ekron, Mazkeret Batya and Tal Shachar
51	Mazkeret Batya Railway Station - Mazkeret Batya - Ganei Yochanan - Yatziz - Ramot Meir - Ganei Hadar - Na'an
52	Mazkeret Batya Railway Station - Beit Elazari - Tel Nof
53	Mazkeret Batya Railway Station - Hulda ‐ Mishmar David - Tal Shahar - Yesodot - Netzer Hazani
54	Mazkeret Batya Railway Station - Kiryat Ekron - Kaplan Medical Center
164	Petah Tikva Kiryat Arye Railway Station – Rehovot Egged Garage Via Rehovot CBS
165	Rehovot CBS - Petah Tikva Kiryat Arye Railway Station (One way only)
166	Rehovot CBS – Ramat Gan Tel HaShomer
174	Rehovot CBS – Tel Aviv Reading Terminal
201	Rehovot CBS – Tel Aviv Carmelit Terminal
204	Rehovot CBS - Rishon LeZion The Gold Mall Via Rishon LeZion Central Bus Station
205	Rehovot CBS - Holon Peres Park
225	Tel Nof – Rehovot Railway Station (One way only)
272	Rehovot, Kiriyat Moshe – Tel Aviv Reading Terminal, Via Highway 20
273	Gedera – Tel Aviv Reading Terminal
274	Kiryat Ekron – Tel Aviv University, via Rehovot, Ness Ziona and Rishon LeZion
276	Kiryat Ekron – Tel Aviv, Arlozorov Terminal, via Kiryat Ekron, Rehovot, Ness Ziona and Highway 20
277	Kiryat Ekron – Tel Aviv, Reading Terminal, via Rehovot, Ness Ziona and Highway 20
318	Rehovot, Avnei Hen – Ramat Gan, Ayalon Mall via Highway 412, Highway 4 and Bnei Brak
319	Rehovot, Avnei Hen – Ramat Gan, Ayalon Mall via Highway 4 and Bnei Brak
326	Mazkeret Batya – Rishon LeZion, Park and Drive

=== Dimona and Yeruham ===
Line	Route
1/1א	Peretz Center – Shivat HaMinim – Giora Yoseftal – Appelman High School – Neve Aviv – Neve Horesh – Har Nof – Ben Gurion Park
2	Peretz Center – Arava – Mamshit – Pirhei Artzeinu – Giora Yoseftal – Ben Attar School – Neve Aviv – Appelman High School – Ne'ot Qatif – HaSachar Neighborhood
3	Peretz Center – Shivat HaMinim – Giora Yoseftal – Neve Gan – Hakhmei Yisrael – Student Village – HaSachar Neighborhood
4	Peretz Center – Herzl blvd. – City Hall – Giora Yoseftal – HaSachar Neighborhood
5/5א	HaSachar Neighborhood – Student Village – Neot Haleli – Neve Aviv – Neve David – City Hall – Giora Yoseftal – Shivtei Yisrael – Mamshit – Arava – Peretz Center – 5א only: Dimona Airfield – Tikshuv Center
7/7א	Yeruham local route. Vardimon blvd. - Neot Hadar - Nave Emek - Neve Nof - Mendel - Nof Midbar - Borenstein - Shaked - Industrial Area(line 7א)
12	HaSachar Neighborhood – Dimona CBS – Dimona Railway Station

== Intercity ==
=== Short distance ===
Line	Route	Type	Via
25	Latrun - Modi'in Maccabim Reut	Regular	Hativa Sheva Junction
31	Ashkelon – Kiryat Mal'akhi	Regular	
32	Mazkeret Batya Railway Station – Beit Shemesh Railway Station	Regular	Highway 411, Highway 44
48/48א	Beer Sheva CBS – Dimona City market	Express	Highway 25
49	Dimona City market – Beer Sheva Turner Stadium	Regular	Highway 25, Beer Sheva: Central Bus Station – University – Soroka Hospital
56/56א	Beer Sheva CBS – Dimona City market	Regular	Highway 25
56	Karmiel railway station – Tiberias CBS	Regular	Rameh, Maghar
57/57א	Dimona Student village– Yeruham	Regular	Camp Mesho'a (57א only)
78	(Circular route) Karmiel Railway Station – Camp Tzalmon – Karmiel Railway Station	Regular	
92	Eilat CBS – Camp Saguv	Regular	Yoseftal Medical Center
159	Petah Tikva Moshe Arns Terminal – Camp Tzrifin	Regular	Highway 4
167	Ra'anana Junction – Nir Tzvi Junction	Regular	Highway 4, Beit Dagan Junction, Tzrifin
202	Haifa Hof HaCarmel CBS – Pardes Hana railway station	Regular	Zichron Ya'akov, Binyamina
215	Karmiel Giv'at Ram – Haifa HaMifratz CBS	Regular	Karmiel CBS, Karmiel Industrial area, Krayot
221	(Circular route) Haifa Hof HaCarmel CBS – Neve Yam – Haifa Hof HaCarmel CBS	Regular	Atlit
226	Tel Aviv CBS – Tel Nof	Regular	Rishon LeZion, Ness Ziona, Rehovot
227	Tel Aviv Arlozorov Terminal – Tel Nof	Direct	
244	Shura Base – Ramat Gan Ayalon Mall	Regular	Ramla CBS, Lod, Or Yehuda
249	Petah Tikva Moshe Arens Terminal – Rehovot CBS	Regular	Lod, Ramla
260	Karmiel CBS – Haifa HaMifraz CBS	Express	I'billin, Highway 70
261	Karmiel CBS – Haifa HaMifraz CBS	Regular	Majd al-Krum, Akko CBS
262	Karmiel CBS – Haifa HaMifraz CBS	Express	Highway 85, Krayot
263	Karmiel CBS – Akko CBS	Express	Majd al-Krum
268	Tel Aviv CBS – Modi'in Maccabim Reut CBS	Regular	Yehud, Shoham, Beit Aryeh-Ofarim
430	Jerusalem Binanei HaUmma – Latrun	Direct	Jerusalem Kiryat HaMemshala
442	Afula CBS – Tiberias CBS	Regular	Kfar Tavor

=== Long distance ===
Line	Route	Type	Via
300	Tel Aviv CBS – Ashkelon CBS	Direct	Highway 4, Highway 44
301	Tel Aviv CBS – Ashkelon CBS	Regular	Rishon LeZion Old CBS, Ness Tziona CBS, Rehovot CBS, Gedera CBS, Mal'akhi Junction
302	Tel Aviv Arlozorov Terminal - Ashkelon Agamim	Direct	Highway 20
304	Tel Aviv Arlozorov Terminal – Ashkelon Academic College	Direct	Highway 20
321	Dimona – Ein Bokek	Regular	Neot HaKikar, Ein Tamar, Dead Sea Works, Neve Zohar
383	Ashkelon CBS – Eilat CBS	Regular	Kiryat Gat CBS, Arad CBS
384	Beer Sheva CBS – Tamar Fieldschool	Express	Shoket Junc. – Arad CBS – Neve Zohar – Ein Bokek – Masada
389	Tel Aviv Center Rail – Arad CBS/Arad Hotels	Direct	Dvira Junction, Meitar Interchange, Tel Arad Junction
390	Tel Aviv CBS – Eilat CBS	Express	Mal'akhi Junction
391	Ashdod CBS – Eilat CBS	Express	Malachi Junc.
392	Eilat CBS – Beersheba CBS	Regular	Ovda, Mitzpe Ramon
393	Tel Aviv CBS – Eilat CBS	Express	Dimona CBS, Be'ersheba CBS, Gedera, Rehovot, Nes Ziona, Rishon LeZion
397	Beersheba CBS – Eilat CBS	Express	Dimona CBS
398	Netanya CBS – Eilat CBS	Express	Ashdod Interchange, Malachi Junc.
399	Hadera CBS – Eilat CBS	Express	Netanya, Hod HaSharon, Petah Tikva
403	Jerusalem CBS - Rishon LeZion Azrieli Rishonim	Regular	Ramla, Be'er Ya'akov
406	Holon Egged Museum – Jerusalem CBS	Direct	Bat Yam
408	Jerusalem CBS – Ramla Kiryat Menahem	Regular	Ben Shemen Interchange, Lod
421	Masada – Tel Aviv Arlozorov Terminal	Express	Ein Bokek – Neve Zohar – Arad
430	Jerusalem HaLeom Parking - Khativa 7 Park and Ride	Express	
430	Tiberias CBS – Haifa Hamifratz CBS	Regular	Shfar'am
431	Jerusalem CBS – Rishon LeZion New CBS	Direct	Highway 431
433	Jerusalem CBS – Rishon LeZion New CBS	Express	Camp Tzrifin
434	Jerusalem CBS – Rehovot CBS	Express	Latrun
434	Tiberias CBS – Haifa Hamifratz CBS	Regular	Krayot
436	Jerusalem CBS – Ashkelon CBS	Direct	
437	Jerusalem CBS – Ashkelon CBS	Regular	Shimshon Junction, Re'em Junction, Mal'akhi Junction
439	Jerusalem CBS – Rehovot, Egged Parking	Express	Highway 431
444	Jerusalem CBS – Eilat CBS	Express	Ein Gedi, Ein Bokek
445	Jerusalem CBS – Eilat CBS	Direct	
446	Jerusalem CBS – Be'er Sheba CBS	Express	Latrun, Re'em Junction, Mal'akhi Junction
447	Jerusalem CBS – Yavne	Regular	Rishon LeZion-HaRishonim Railway Station, Ness Ziona
449	Jerusalem CBS – Kiryat Gat	Regular	Shimshon Junction, Re'em Junction, Mal'akhi Junction
456	Jerusalem CBS – Tzrifin	Express	Shamir Medical Center
460	Jerusalem CBS – Kiryat Gat	Express	Highway 6
470	Jerusalem CBS – Be'er Sheba CBS	Direct	Highway 6
471	Jerusalem CBS – Tel Aviv Arlozorov Terminal	Regular	Giv'at Zeev
478	Ma'ale Adumim – Be'er Sheba CBS	Direct	Highway 6
480	Jerusalem CBS – Tel Aviv Arlozorov Terminal	Direct	Highway 1
481	Tel Aviv Arlozorov Terminal - Ma'ale Adumim	Direct	Jerusalem
482	Tel Aviv Arlozorov Terminal - Jerusalem Neve Yaakov	Direct	Highway 443, Jerusalem Pisgat Ze'ev
486	Jerusalem CBS – Neve Zohar	Express	Ein Gedi, Ein Bokek
487	Jerusalem CBS – Ein Gedi	Express	
490	Tel Aviv Arlozorov Terminal - Jerusalem Talpiyot Industrial Area	Express	Highway 16
500	Kiryat Shmona CBS – Haifa HaMifraz CBS	Direct	Ami'ad, Karmiel, Akko, Kiryat Haim
503	Haifa HaMifratz CBS – Katzrin	Regular	Kiryat Haim, Akko, Karmiel
505	Kiryat Shmona CBS – Haifa HaMifraz CBS	Regular	Rosh Pina, Golani Interchange, Kiryat Tivon
541	Kiryat Shmona CBS – Afula CBS	Regular	Hatzor HaGlilit, Rosh Pina, Tiberias
542	Kiryat Shmona CBS – Afula CBS	Regular	Hatzor HaGlilit, Rosh Pina
703	Hadera CBS – Tel Aviv CBS	Express	Giv'at Olga, Highway 2
704	Tel Aviv Arlozorov Terminal - Hadera CBS	Direct	Highway 2
784	Haifa, Technion – Tel Aviv CBS	Express	Atlit Interchange, Hadera, Netanya, Herzliya
790	Tel Aviv Arlozorov Terminal – Eilat CBS	Direct	
794	Tel Aviv Arlozorov Terminal – Eilat CBS	Express	Rishon LeZion New CBS, Beer Sheba CBS, Dimona CBS
797	Beersheva CBS - Eilat CBS	Direct	
800	Tel Aviv CBS – Kiryat Shmona CBS	Direct	
807	Tel Aviv Reading Terminal – Harish	Express	Netanya, Pardes-Hanna Karkur
821	Afula CBS – Ra'anana Junction	Regular	Beit Lid Junction, Hadera CBS
825	Tel Aviv CBS – Afula CBS	Express	
826	Tel Aviv CBS – Nof HaGalil Garage	Express	Fureidis Junction, Yokneam Illit, Migdal HaEmek, Nazareth
832	Beit Shean – Tel Aviv CBS	Express	Nir David, Gan HaShlosha, Beit Alfa
834	Ashdot Ya'akov – Tel Aviv CBS	Express	Kinneret, Yavne'el, Kfar Kama, Kfar Tavor, Mt. Tavor, Afula CBS
836	Tiberias CBS – Tel Aviv CBS	Express	Yokneam Illit
840	Tel Aviv CBS – Kiryat Shmona CBS	Regular	Hadera CBS, Afula CBS, Tiberias CBS, Hazor HaGlilit CBT
843	Tel Aviv CBS – Katzrin	Express	Beit She'an, Tsemah Junction, Ein Gev, Kursi
845	Tel Aviv CBS – Kiryat Shmona CBS	Express	Rosh Pina CBS, Hazor HaGlilit CBT
846	Tel Aviv CBS – Safed CBS	Express	Jepthahel Interchange, Kafr Manda, Karmiel, Rameh, Mt. Meron
847	Petah Tikva Kiryat Arye Train Station – Hatzor HaGlilit CBT	Regular	Hod HaSharon, Ra'anana Junction, Hadera CBS, Highway 6, Yokneam Illit Junction, Golani Interchange, Rosh Pina CBS
848	Tel Aviv CBS – Karmiel CBS	Express	Jepthahel Interchange, Kafr Manda
852	Tel Aviv CBS – Pardes Hana railway station	Express	Hadera
853	Golan Heights – Tel Aviv CBS	Regular	Kursi, Ein Gev, Tzemach Junction, Ashdot Ya'akov, Beit She'an
870	Afula CBS – Be'er sheba CBS	Direct	Highway 6
873	Tel Aviv CBS - Binyamina	Express	Tel Aviv Arlozorov Terminal
880	Tiberias CBS – Be'er Sheva CBS	Direct	
893	Haifa Haifa HaMifraz CBS – Eilat CBS	Direct	Highway 6
900	Tel Aviv CBS - Haifa Hof HaCarmel Central Bus Station	Direct	Tel Aviv Arlozorov Terminal
905	Haifa Hamifratz CBS - Ben Gurion Airport Terminal 3	Express	Haifa Hof HaCarmel CBS, Hadera, Netanya, Hertzliya, Tel Aviv
909	Tel Aviv CBS - Nahariya CBS	Express	Haifa HaMifraz Central Bus Station, Akko
910	Tel Aviv Central Bus Station – Haifa Hof HaCarmel Central Bus Station	Express	Herzliya, Netanya, Atlit
912	Jerusalem CBS – Tiberias	Express	Highway 6, Tiberias Illit
921	Petah Tikva Kiryat Aryeh railway station – Haifa Hof HaCarmel CBS	Regular	Hod Hasharon, HaSharon Junction, Highway 4, Hadera CBS
930	Jerusalem CBS – Netanya CBS	Direct	Hod HaSharon, Ra'anana Junction
940	Haifa Hof HaCarmel CBS – Jerusalem CBS	Direct	Highway 6
942	Hadera CBS – Jerusalem CBS	Express	Harish, Highway 6
947	Petah Tikva – Haifa Hof HaCarmel CBS	Express	Ra'anana Junction, Netanya CBS
950	Jerusalem CBS – Netanya CBS	Regular	Ben Gurion Airport – Petah Tikva – Hod HaSharon – Kfar Saba- Ra'anana Junction
953	Jerusalem CBS - Afula CBS	Express	Umm al-Fahm
955	Jerusalem CBS – Nof HaGalil	Express	Umm al-Fahm, Nazareth
958	Be'ersheba CBS - Karmiel CBS	Direct	
959	Jerusalem CBS – Tiberias	Express	Afula, Kfar Tavor
960	Jerusalem CBS – Haifa HaMifratz CBS	Direct	Highway 6, Yokneam Illit
961	Jerusalem CBS – Tiberias CBS	Regular	Jordan Valley, Beit She'an, Dgania
962	Jerusalem CBS – Tiberias	Express	Highway 6
963	Jerusalem CBS – Kiryat Shmona CBS	Express	Highway 6, Afula CBS, Tiberias CBS, Rosh Pina CBS
964	Jerusalem CBS - Hazor HaGlilit CBT	Express	Rosh Pina CBS
966	Jerusalem CBS – Katzrin	Express	Beit She'an CBS, Tsemah Junction, Ein Gev, Kursi
967	Jerusalem CBS - Beit She'an CBS	Regular	Jordan Valley
968	Jerusalem CBS - Karmiel CBS	Express	Highway 6, Yokneam Illit
991	Eilat CBS – Haifa Hof HaCarmel CBS	Express	Highway 6, HaArava Junction, Kiryat Mal'akhi, Netanya CBS, Hadera CBS
992	Eilat CBS – Afula	Direct	Highway 6
993	Haifa HaMifraz CBS – Eilat CBS	Express	Highway 6
994	Karmiel railway station - Eilat CBS	Express	Highway 6

=== Long distance lines oriented at Orthodox population ===
Line	Route	Type	Via
402	Jerusalem Haarazim Terminal – Bnei Brak	Express	Jerusalem Kiryat Belz
407	Jerusalem Haarazim Terminal – Netanya Ein HaTchelet	Direct	Jerusalem Kiryat Belz, Jerusalem CBS
409	Jerusalem Binyanei HaUmma – Bnei Brak	Express	Jerusalem Kiryat Belz, Geha Interchange
411	Jerusalem Malha – Bnei Brak	Direct	Jerusalem Ba'it VeGan
412	Jerusalem Neve Yaakov – Bnei Brak	Direct	Highway 443
413	Jerusalem Har Nof - Bnei Brak	Direct	
416	Jerusalem Binyanei HaUmma – Bnei Brak	Direct	
424	Jerusalem Haarazim Terminal – Rehovot Kiryat David	Direct	Jerusalem Kiryat Belz, Jerusalem CBS
426	Jerusalem Haarazim Terminal – Petah Tikva Kiryat Aryeh	Express	Jerusalem Chords Bridge
543	Arad – Kumemiyut/Kiryat Gat	Express	
546	Jerusalem – Kumemiyut	Direct	
547	Ashdod - Kiryat Gat	Express	
549	Bnei Brak – Kumemiyut	Direct	
550	Arad – Bnei Brak	Express	Kiryat Gat
552	Arad – Ashdod	Express	Kiryat Gat
554	Jerusalem Har Nof – Arad	Express	Kiryat Gat
555	Jerusalem Nof – Arad	Direct	
556	Kiryat Gat – Jerusalem Har Nof	Express	
557	Kiryat Gat – Bnei Brak	Express	
558	Arad - Bnei Brak	Direct	
560	Arad – Ashdod	Direct	
951	Bnei Brak - Migdal HaEmek	Direct	
952	Jerusalem Haarazim Terminal – Migdal HaEmek	Direct	
954	Bnei Brak – Karmiel	Express	Highway 6, Kiryat Ata
956	Jerusalem Har Hotzvim – Nof HaGalil	Direct	
957	Bnei Brak – Rekhasim	Direct	
970	Bnei Brak – Haifa Meonot Ge'ula	Direct	Netanya
971	Bnei Brak – Haifa Meonot Ge'ula	Direct	Netanya
972	Jerusalem Haarazim Terminal – Haifa	Direct	Jerusalem Kiryat Belz, Jerusalem CBS, Highway 443
973	Ashdod – Haifa	Direct	
975	Netanya – Haifa	Direct	
976	Haifa Meonot Geu'la – Jerusalem Haarazim Terminal	Direct	
977	Netanya Laniado Hospital – Ashdod Quarter H	Direct	
978	Beit Shemesh – Haifa Meonot Geu'la	Direct	
986	Beitar Illit - Haifa	Express	Highway 6, Rekhasim
988	Bnei Brak – Karmiel	Direct	Highway 6
989	Beit Shemesh – Kiryat Ata	Direct	Rekhasim
996	Jerusalem Haarazim Terminal – Rekhasim	Direct	
999	Jerusalem Haarazim Terminal – Kiryat Ata	Express	Jerusalem Kiryat Belz, Jerusalem CBS, Rekhasim
