= Ir Ganim =

Neighborhood in Jerusalem

Coordinates: 31°45′14.62″N 35°10′16.11″E

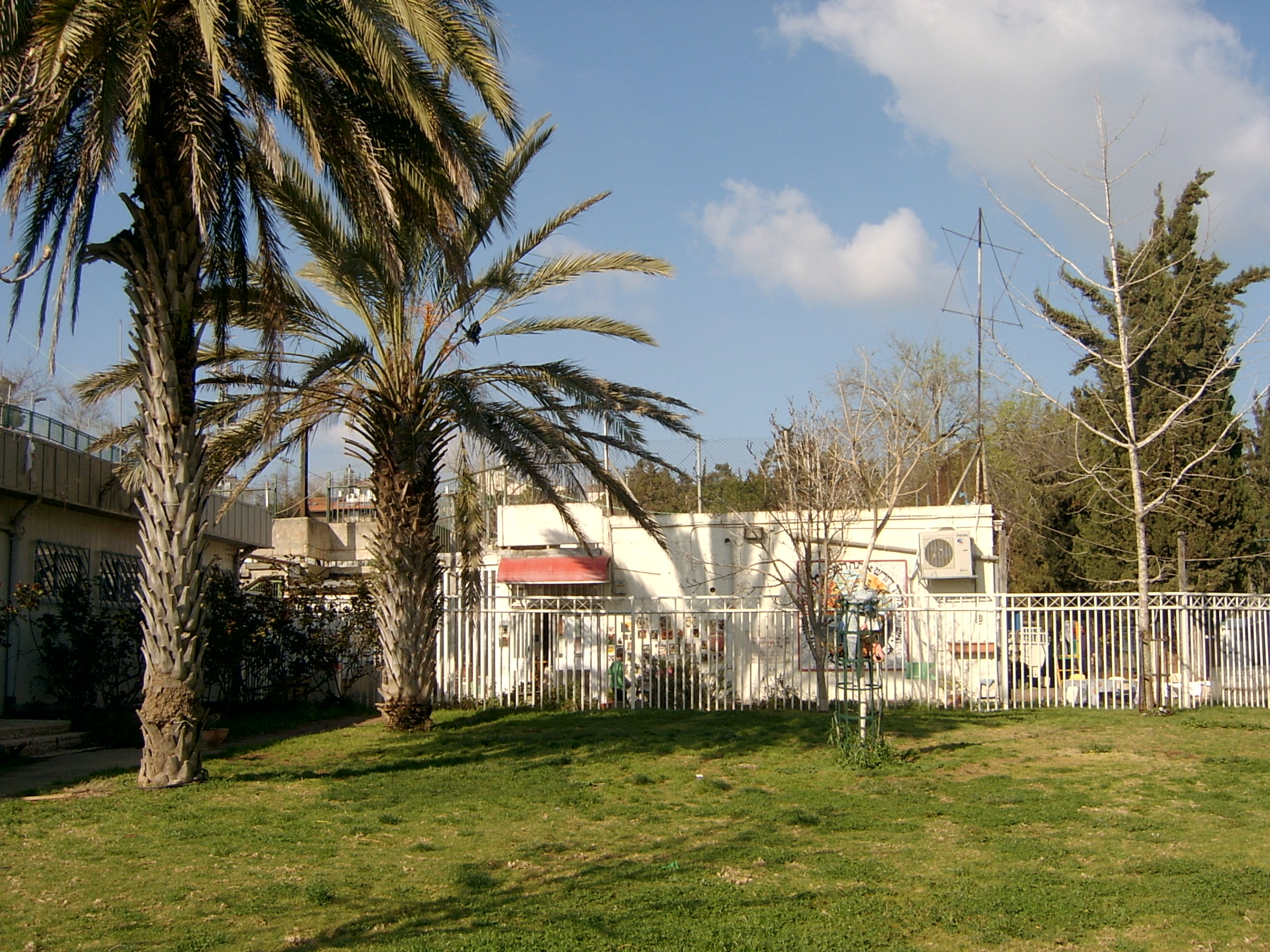
Ir Ganim

Ir Ganim (Hebrew: עיר גנים, "city of gardens") is a neighborhood in southwest Jerusalem, bordering Kiryat Menachem.

== History ==
Planning for Ir Ganim began in 1953. It was designed for a population of 8,000-10,000 new immigrants on 1,577 dunams of land. The first 500 housing units were built by the Rassco company employing a higher standard of building than other new immigrant neighborhoods. Each home had a private garden. Ir Ganim Aleph was established in 1957. Before moving to Ir Ganim, most of the residents had been living in maabarot (transit camps). Some of the land was owned by the Jewish National Fund and the rest was provided by the Israel Lands Administration.

== Demographics ==
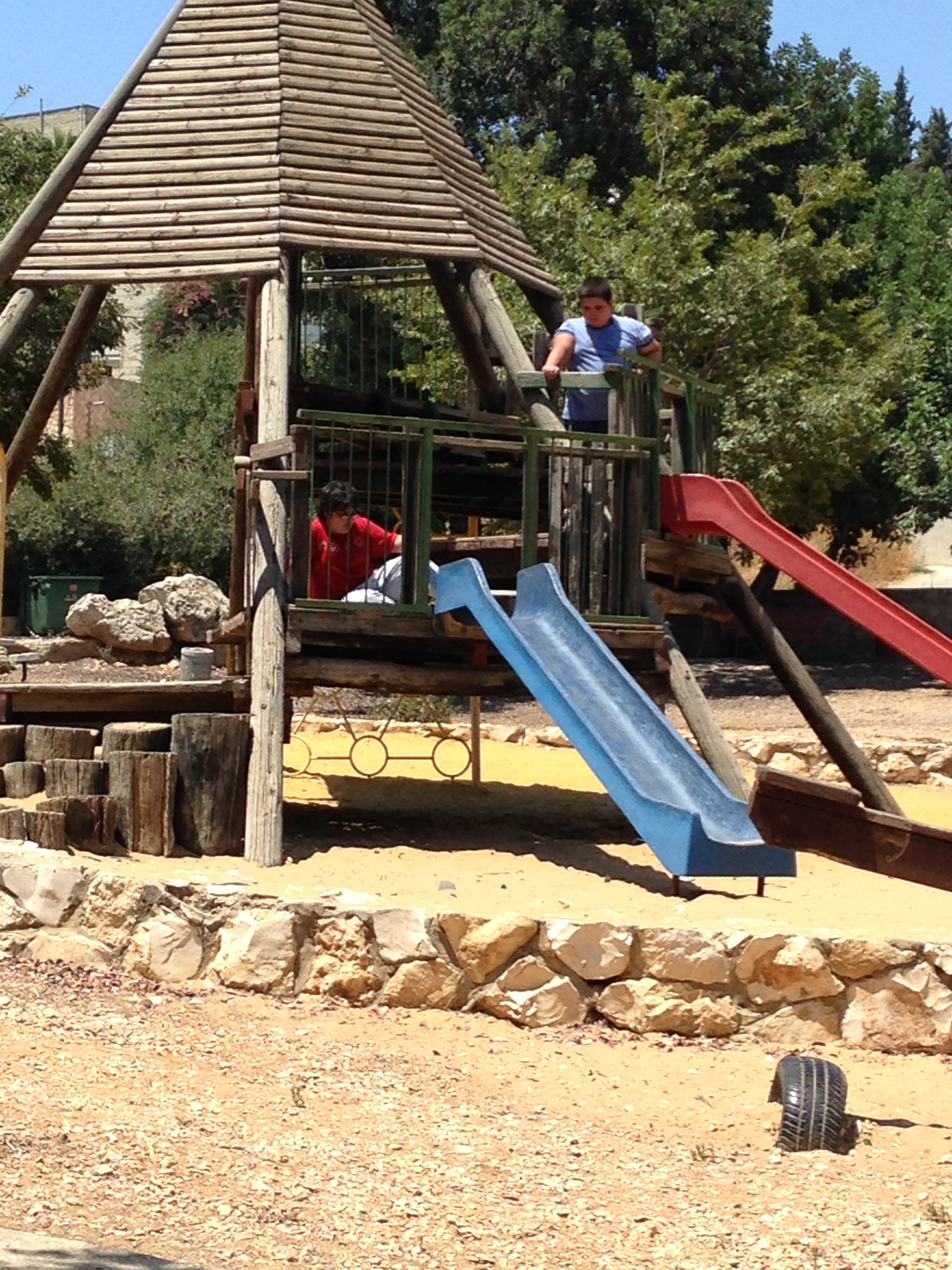
Ir Ganim park.

The population of Ir Ganim neighborhood is diverse, including both native Israelis and immigrants from Ethiopia and Russia. It is considered a poor neighborhood, but has wealthier sections, such as Ir Ganim Aleph, overlooking the Judean Mountains. Kibbutz Reisheet, an urban kibbutz, is located in Ir Ganim.

== Sections and streets ==
The neighborhood is divided into three sections: Ir Ganim Aleph, between Mexico Road and Halamit Road, west of the valley that separates it from Kiryat Hayovel. Ir Ganim Bet lies between Panama, Dahomey, Halamit and Avivit Roads; and Ir Ganim Gimmel is bordered by Costa Rica Road. Many of the streets are named for countries in Latin America that voted in favor of the establishment of the State of Israel in 1948. Others are named for wildflowers.

== Public institutions ==
Ir Ganim shares a library and a community center (matnas)) with Kiryat Menachem.

== Archaeology ==
Surveys conducted on the slope stretching between Ha-Nurit and Costa Rica Streets in 'Ir Gannim documented burial caves, rock-cut installations, and modern agricultural terraces.

In 2005, before a new residential complex was built, rescue excavations were carried out at the slope. These excavations uncovered a sealed rock-cut burial cave typical to the late Second Temple Period, which contained well-preserved, in situ ossuaries, dating from the early Roman period. Additionally, archaeologists found rock-cut winepresses and architectural fragments dating back to the Roman-Byzantine periods.

Further salvage excavations in 2011 unveiled more ancient installations, including both rock-cut and built elements. Scholars have identified two distinct phases of construction: an earlier phase dating back no later than the Hasmonean period, and a later phase dating to the early Roman period.

== Nahal Lavan ==
The Lavan Valley is situated between Ir Ganim and Givat Massuah to the east and Moshav Ora to the west. The valley contains the riverhead of Nahal Sifan, the Second Temple period site of Ha-Rogem, olive presses, water cisterns and watch towers, and the ruins of an ancient settlement near Ein Lavan Spring.
