= Egged Bus 99 =

99
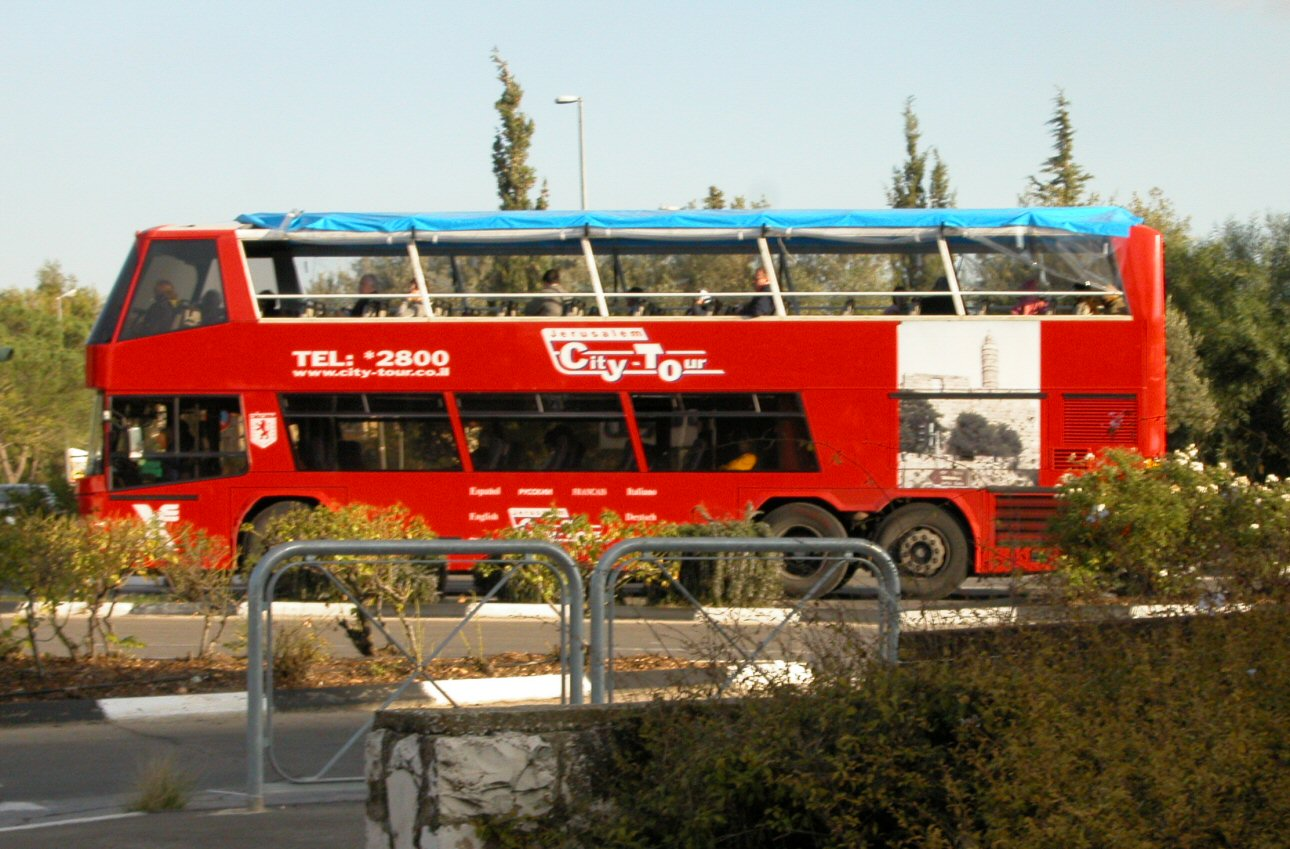
- Neoplan bodied coach in November 2007

Overview
- Operator: Yara Tours

Route
- Start: Central Bus Station
- End: Supreme Court of Israel

Egged Bus 99 was a bus route operated for tourists in Jerusalem. The bus, which had 29 stops, was a hop-on/hop-off double-decker that serviced 35 of the city's leading tourist attractions, offering audio commentary in eight languages.

In 2015, Egged sold the bus route and its double-decker buses to Yara Tours. During Yara Tours' operation of the route, it was available by request only. By 2016, Yara Tours had completely ceased operating the route; the newest bus from the fleet was sold, and the older buses were retired from service.

== Stops ==
The Egged 99 Bus stopped at:

1. Central Bus Station
2. Mahane Yehuda Market
3. Davidka Square
4. Novotel Hotel
5. Grand Court Hotel
6. Ammunition Hill
7. Regency Hotel
8. Hadassah Medical Center
9. Mount Scopus
10. Augusta Victoria Hospital
11. Lions' Gate
12. City of David
13. Dung Gate
14. Mount Zion
15. Jaffa Gate
16. King David Hotel
17. Khan Theatre
18. Haas Promenade
19. Malha Mall
20. Biblical Zoo
21. Herzl Museum
22. Yad Vashem
23. Bloomfield Science Museum
24. Hebrew University of Jerusalem at Givat Ram
25. Bible Lands Museum
26. Israel Museum
27. Knesset
28. Supreme Court of Israel

== See also ==
- Tourism in Israel
- List of Egged bus routes in Israel
