= Bank of Jerusalem =

Israeli banking institution

Bank of Jerusalem, Ltd.
- Native name: בנק ירושלים
- Company type: Public company (TASE: JBNK)
- Industry: Banking financial services
- Founded: 1963; 63 years ago
- Founder: Charles Clore, Isaac Wolfson
- Headquarters: Jerusalem
- Number of locations: 24 (2015)
- Services: Credit cards, consumer banking, corporate banking, finance and insurance, investment banking, mortgage loans, private banking, private equity, savings, Securities, asset management, wealth management
- Revenue: ▲ ₪820 Million (2022)
- Net income: ▲ ₪163 Million (2022)
- Total assets: ▲ ₪14.2 billion (2015)
- Total equity: ▲ ₪965 million (13 March 2024)
- Number of employees: 638 (2022)
- Capital ratio: 10.5%
- Website: www.bankjerusalem.co.il

Bank of Jerusalem, Ltd (Hebrew: בנק ירושלים) is Israel's seventh-largest bank, with total assets of 9,301 million shekels. Bank of Jerusalem is headquartered in Jerusalem and has 25 branches around the country.

The bank is controlled by Export Investment Corp., Ltd., a public company controlled by the Shoval family.

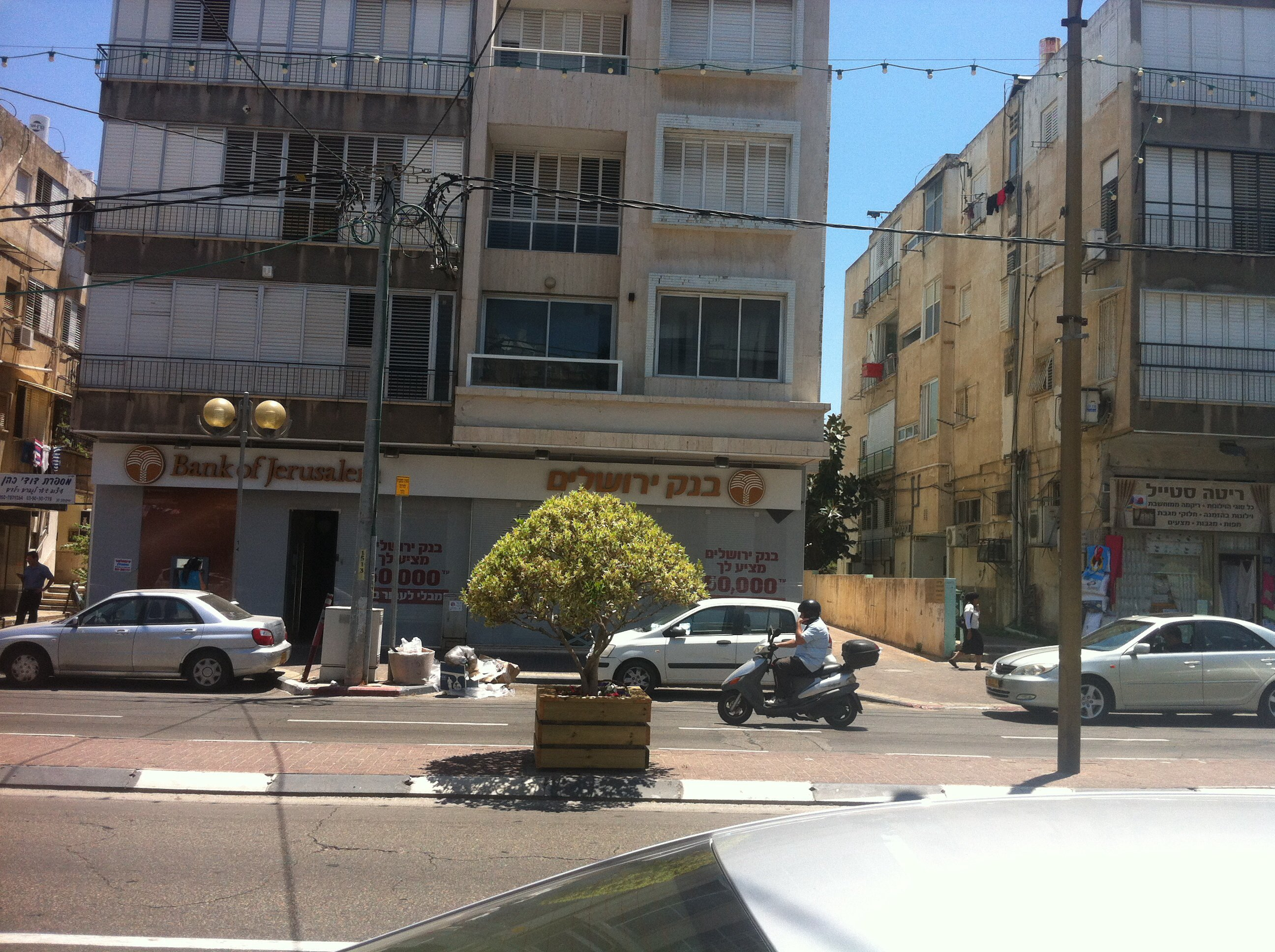
Bank of Jerusalem Holon branch

== History ==
=== Establishment of the bank ===
The idea of establishing a bank in Jerusalem that would focus on financing economic activity in Jerusalem first arose in the late 1950s, initiated by a number of Jerusalem businessmen. Concurrently, the Jerusalem Workers' Loan and Savings Fund also sought to become a bank. Initially, the Bank of Israel opposed the establishment of new banks at that time, but in 1963, it agreed to the establishment of a mortgage bank in Jerusalem.

The bank was founded in 1963 as a mortgage bank to support housing development in Jerusalem by Mordechai Meir, Charles Clore, Isaac Wolfson and the Municipality of Jerusalem. In December 1963, the bank was granted a license under the name "Bank Yerushalayim for Development and Mortgages Ltd." The Mayor of Jerusalem, Mordechai Ish-Shalom, was appointed as the bank's president.

"Bank Jerusalem" was the second bank to operate under that name. In 1928, members of the old Haredi community, including Moshe Porush, established "Bank Jerusalem Ltd." This bank was sold and merged with the Poalei Agudat Israel Bank in 1938.

=== Acquisition by the Shoval family ===
The initial shareholders of the bank were: Wolfson-Klor Corporation, government housing and development company, Export Investment Company (owned by the Meir brothers), Jerusalem Loan and Savings Bank, the Municipality of Jerusalem, and the Workers' Union. Isaac Wolfson was appointed chairman of the board, with Charles Klor and Moshe Meir serving as his deputies.

The bank primarily engaged in financing residential construction in Jerusalem and played a role in establishing Kiryat Wolfson and the Ramat Sharet neighborhood.

Over the years the Meir brothers acquired a majority of the bank's shares. After acquiring full ownership of the Wolfson-Klor Meir Corporation, which held the majority of shares in the bank, and also owning an export company that held shares in the bank, the Meir brothers acquired most of the bank's shares. In 1989, the brothers decided to separate their business interests, and Moshe Meir took control of the bank. Moshe Meir appointed Zalman Shoval, who was married to his daughter, as chairman of the bank. Shoval also served as a Knesset member at the time, which raised criticism of conflict of interest. After Moshe Meir's death in 1993, the bank came under the control of Zalman and Kna Shoval.

=== 1990s ===
In 1992 the bank had an initial public offering on the Tel Aviv Stock Exchange. In August 1998, Bank of Jerusalem received a commercial banking license from the Bank of Israel, replacing the financial-institution license that it had held until then. By obtaining this license, Bank of Jerusalem completed its transformation into a commercial bank that specializes in real estate, the capital market, and international banking.

In 1997 the bank received a financial institution license from the Bank of Israel under the Banking Law. Under the license, the bank was allowed to engage in all activities permitted to a banking corporation licensed as a "bank," except for check payments on demand. In 1998, it received a commercial bank license as part of the bank's efforts to enter the commercial credit, loans, and savings sector for the private sector. With this license, the bank completed its transformation into a commercial bank.

=== 21st century ===
In 2002 the bank began issuing credit cards to its customers in partnership with Credit Cards Israel.

In 2010 the bank's board of directors decided on a business strategy focusing on controlled growth, with an emphasis on specialized commercial activity in mortgages and continued development of consumer credit, while maintaining a low-risk profile reflected in the business activity mix, alongside customer and revenue source diversity and operations. About 20 million shekels were invested in upgrading computer systems and cyber protection, a call center and digital archive were established, a customer relationship management system was implemented, the bank's website was upgraded, and ATMs with the ability to withdraw cash, deposit cash, and deposit checks were installed in all bank branches.

In 2011 following social protests, the bank decided to change its interest rate policy on bank deposits that had been in effect until that time. while banks in the country offered their customers 20% of the Bank of Israel's interest and keep 80% of it, Jerusalem Bank offered customers 80% of the interest and retained 20% of it. The bank referred to this change as a transition from the minimum method to the maximum method. Starting in the second half of 2013, the bank reduced this policy and offered its customers only half of the Bank of Israel's interest.

Since 2010 the bank has been focusing on developing its retail banking activities, offering current accounts and savings accounts to consumers.

In 2013 the bank acquired General Finance-Assuta Investment Management Company. This significantly increased its activity in the local capital market. However, it sold this activity to Meitav Dash after four years.

In 2017 the bank launched a service for a prepaid debit card, primarily targeting employees without a bank account who receive their monthly salary in cash, allowing them to receive their salary on a credit card.

In 2018 the bank attempted to acquire Municipal Bank (then owned by the Belgian-French banking and finance group Dexia), but its acquisition proposal was rejected in favor of a competing offer from Discount Bank.

=== Criticism ===
==== Involvement in Israeli settlements ====
On 12 February 2020 the United Nations published a database of companies doing business related in the West Bank, including East Jerusalem, as well as in the occupied Golan Heights. Bank of Jerusalem was listed on the database on account of its activities in Israeli settlements in these occupied territories, which are considered illegal under international law.

== See also ==
- Bank of Israel
