= Kiryat Menachem bus bombing =

2002 suicide bombing in Jerusalem

- Part of the Second Intifada militancy campaign
- The attack site
- Native name: הפיגוע בקו 20 בירושלים
- Location: 31°45′29″N 35°10′10″E; Kiryat Menachem, Jerusalem
- Date: November 21, 2002; 23 years ago c. 7:00 am (UTC+2)
- Attack type: Suicide bomber
- Weapon: 5 kilograms (11 lb) suicide vest
- Deaths: 11 civilians (including 4 children) & 1 attacker
- Injuries: 50+ civilians
- Perpetrator: Hamas claimed responsibility
- No. of participants: 1

A Palestinian suicide bombing occurred on November 21, 2002 in a public bus in the neighborhood of Kiryat Menachem in Jerusalem. 11 people were murdered in the attack and over 50 were injured.

The Palestinian Islamist militant organization Hamas claimed responsibility for the attack.

== The attack ==
On November 21, 2002, at around 7:00 am, Palestinian suicide bomber Na'el Abu Hilail, wearing an explosives belt packed with five-kilograms of explosives and shrapnel, boarded the public bus on Mexico Street in Jerusalem.

The suicide bomber detonated the explosives in the crowded bus, before the bus reached the next stop, while the bus was in the suburban neighborhood of Kiryat Menachem. 11 people were killed in the attack and over 50 were injured.

== The perpetrators ==
Hamas took credit for the attack, which was carried out by Na'el Abu Hilail, 22, from el-Khader, just south of Bethlehem. Four of the victims were children on their way to school. Abu Hilail's father said he was pleased with his son, saying "Our religion says we are proud of him until the day of resurrection." His friends said he was a supporter of Islamic Jihad.

== See also ==
- Israeli casualties of war
