= Ramat Sharett =

Jewish neighborhood in Jerusalem

Coordinates: 31°45′40.44″N 35°11′13.51″E

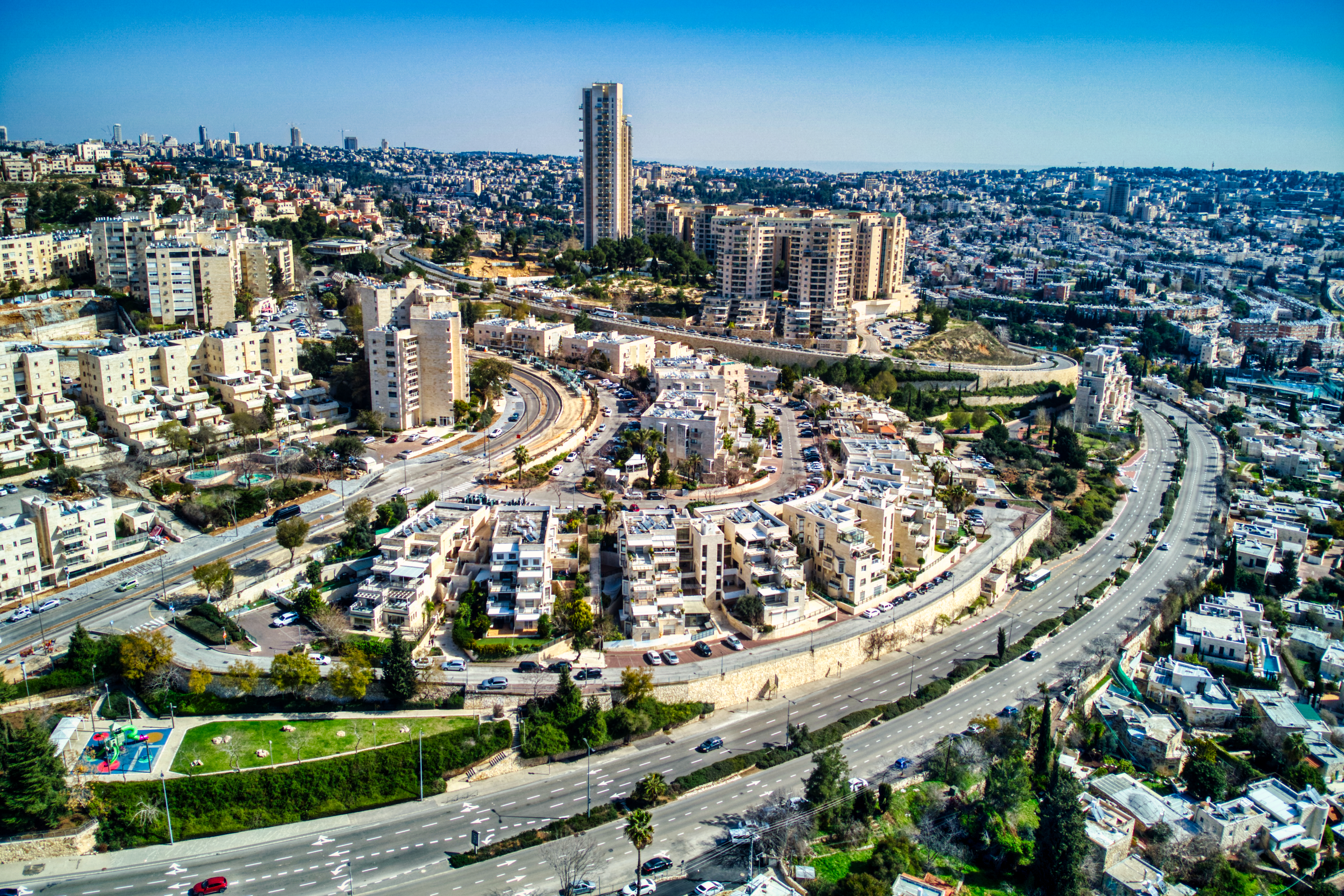
Holyland towers and Ramat Sharett

Ramat Sharett (Hebrew: רמת שרת) (lit. "Sharett Heights") is a neighbourhood in southwest Jerusalem, located between Ramat Denya and Beit VeGan. The neighborhood was established in 1974 and named for Moshe Sharett, Prime Minister of Israel in 1953–1955.

Ramat Sharett sits 860 meters above sea level.

== History ==
An agreement to establish a neighbourhood on the land of the abandoned Arab village of Al-Malha was signed in 1964 by the "Housing and Development" company, "Wolfson Kalor Meir," Bank of Jerusalem, and the Ministry of Construction and Housing. Initially, the neighbourhood was named "Manhat," but several years after the death of Moshe Sharett (who died in 1965), it was decided to rename it "Ramot Sharet", and later changed to "Ramat Sharet". The actual construction of the neighbourhood began in the early 1970s, with about 450 housing units built in Phase 1. The first residents lived in three-room apartment buildings (on Kadish Luz Street), which were intended for young couples, immigrants from other Jerusalem neighbourhoods, and other eligible housing applicants. By 1976, the neighbourhood was inhabited, but infrastructure and infrastructure were not yet complete, and it was not yet connected to the telephone network.

In the first decade of the 21st century, the companies "Azorim" (originally the "Housing and Development" company) and "Wolfson Kalor Meir" completed the "Ramat Sharett Areas" project on the last vacant lot they owned in the neighbourhood.

== Notable people ==
- Dalia Itzik
- Yigal Yasinov
- Ofer Berkovitch
