= Kiryat Menachem =

Neighborhood in Jerusalem

Coordinates: 31°45′28.61″N 35°9′53.09″E

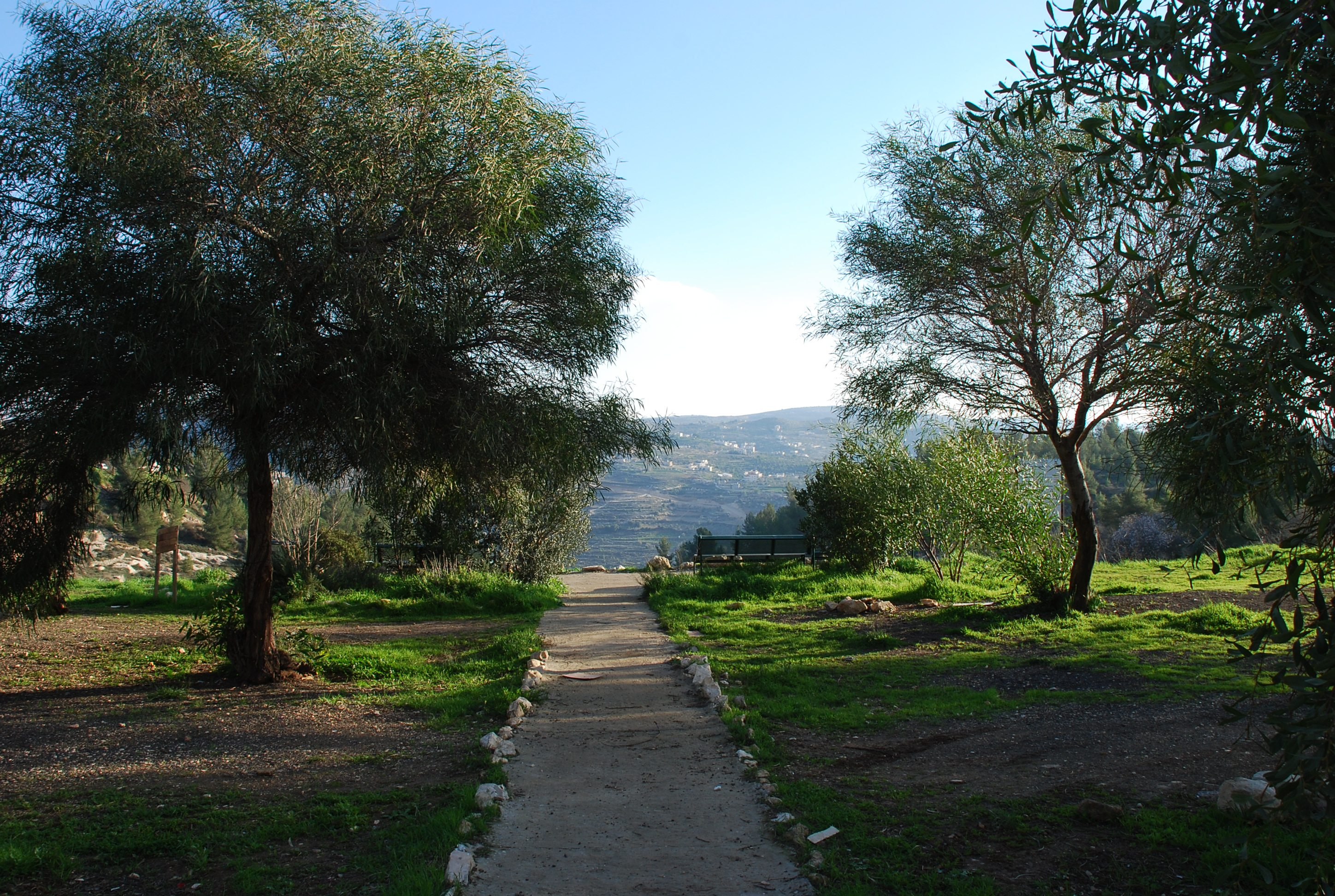
Panama Street Park, Kiryat Menachem

Kiryat Menachem (Hebrew: קרית מנחם) is a neighborhood in southwest Jerusalem. It is bordered by Ir Ganim to the south and east, Mount Ora to the west, and the Jerusalem hills to the north. To the west are steep hills that descend toward streams that flow into Nahal Sorek to the north of Hadassah Ein Karem Hospital. The neighborhood overlooks the village of Ein Karem, Nahal Sorek, and the ruins of Sataf.

== Name ==
The neighborhood was named for American Zionist leader Max (Menachem) Bressler, head of the Jewish National Fund, during his lifetime.

== Demographics ==
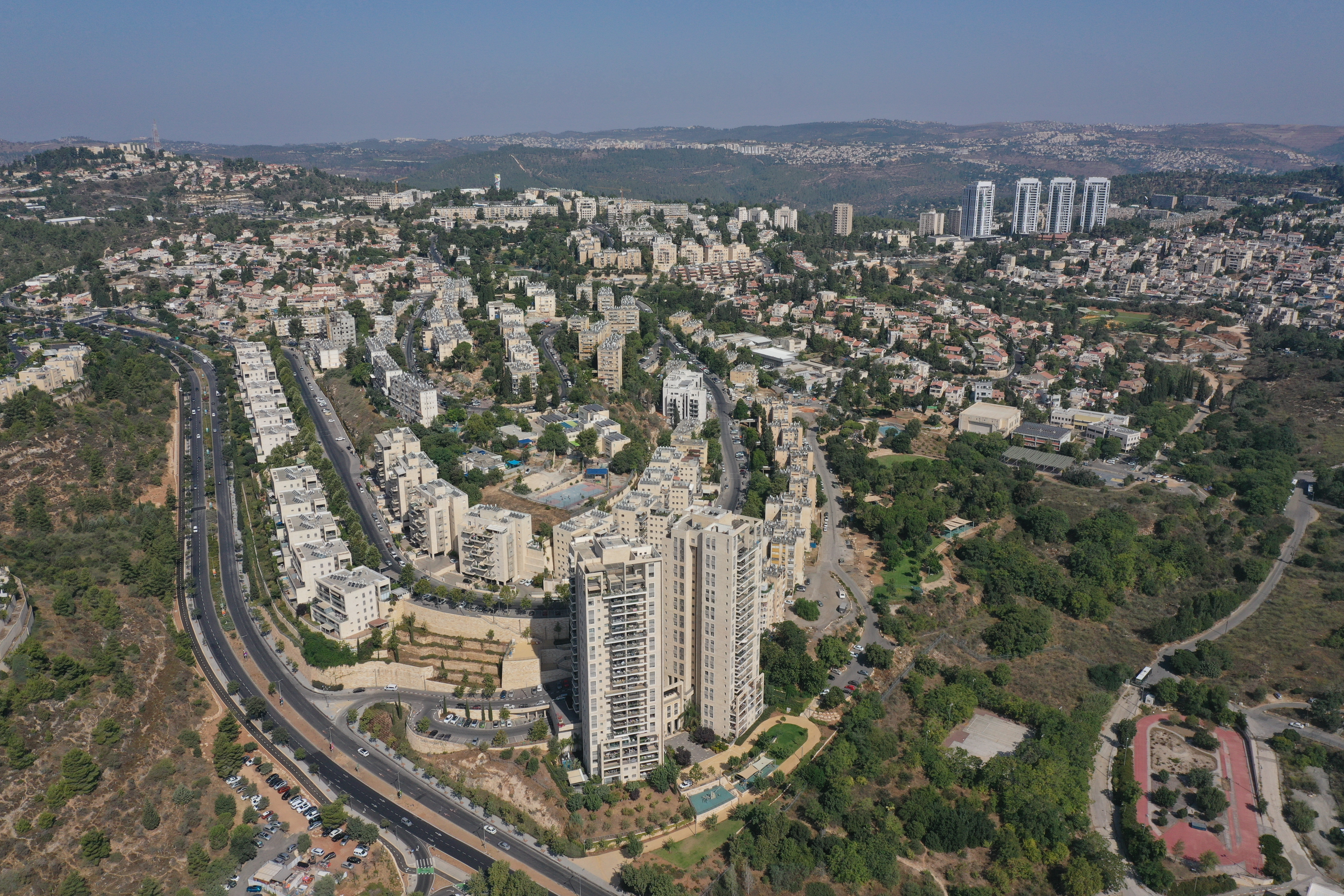
An aerial view of Kiryat Menachem and Kiryat Yovel

Kiryat Menachem and Ir Ganim are a single geographic unit with a population of about 15,000. The neighborhood's population is quite heterogeneous, with veteran residents and new immigrants from Ethiopia and the former Soviet Union.

There are various types of housing in the neighborhood, in keeping with the population's mixture of socioeconomic levels. These include low-rise buildings and homes with gardens, mainly in Ir Ganim A and Ir Ganim B, and high-rise buildings of 4–8 stories with very small apartments throughout most of the rest of the neighborhood. Some of these buildings, particularly in Ir Ganim C and parts of Kiryat Menachem, were erected in the 1950s as temporary housing for immigrants, and are now in serious disrepair. In the 1990s urban renewal projects were carried out in these neighborhoods and some of the buildings were renovated and expanded.

Since this neighborhood is on the outskirts of Jerusalem and has a mixture of populations that have no easy access to the cultural and leisure activities in the city center, the Kiryat Menachem-Ir Ganim neighborhood has developed social solidarity and community institutions that make this area a desirable place to live.

== Educational institutions ==
Kiryat Menachem has many educational institutions, including the Henrietta Szold Institute, National Institute for Research in the Behavioral Sciences, Guatemala School, Chabad School and Reishit state religious school built by the urban kibbutz located in the neighborhood. The local Amit high school is for both religious and non-religious students, with the vast majority of the students coming from outside the neighborhood. Kiryat Menachem's youth belong to chapters of three youth movements: Scouts, Ezra and Acharai.

== Community organizations ==
Various community organizations operate in Kiryat Menachem, such as:

- Ganim Community Council
- Food Cooperative (Established by the Community Advocacy organization)
- Yad Marlene (Support center for elementary school children)
- Urban Kibbutz "Reishit"
- Tzeva (Center for mentoring immigrant children)
- Educational welfare (a branch of the government project for investing in education)
- Social neighborhood renewal
- Kidum Noar (youth guidance organization)
- Garin Dvash (an ecological group for community environmental development)
- Shachen Tov (Good Neighbor – distribution of food for families in need)
- Machshava Tova (Accessing computers to the community)
- The National Program for Children and Youth at Risk
- "Rachel" Child Development Center

There are many active volunteer groups in Kiryat Menachem, joined each year by graduates of the "Scouts" and "Acharai" youth movements. Further more there is also a group of national service girls from the "Bat Ami" organization.

== Ganim Community Council ==
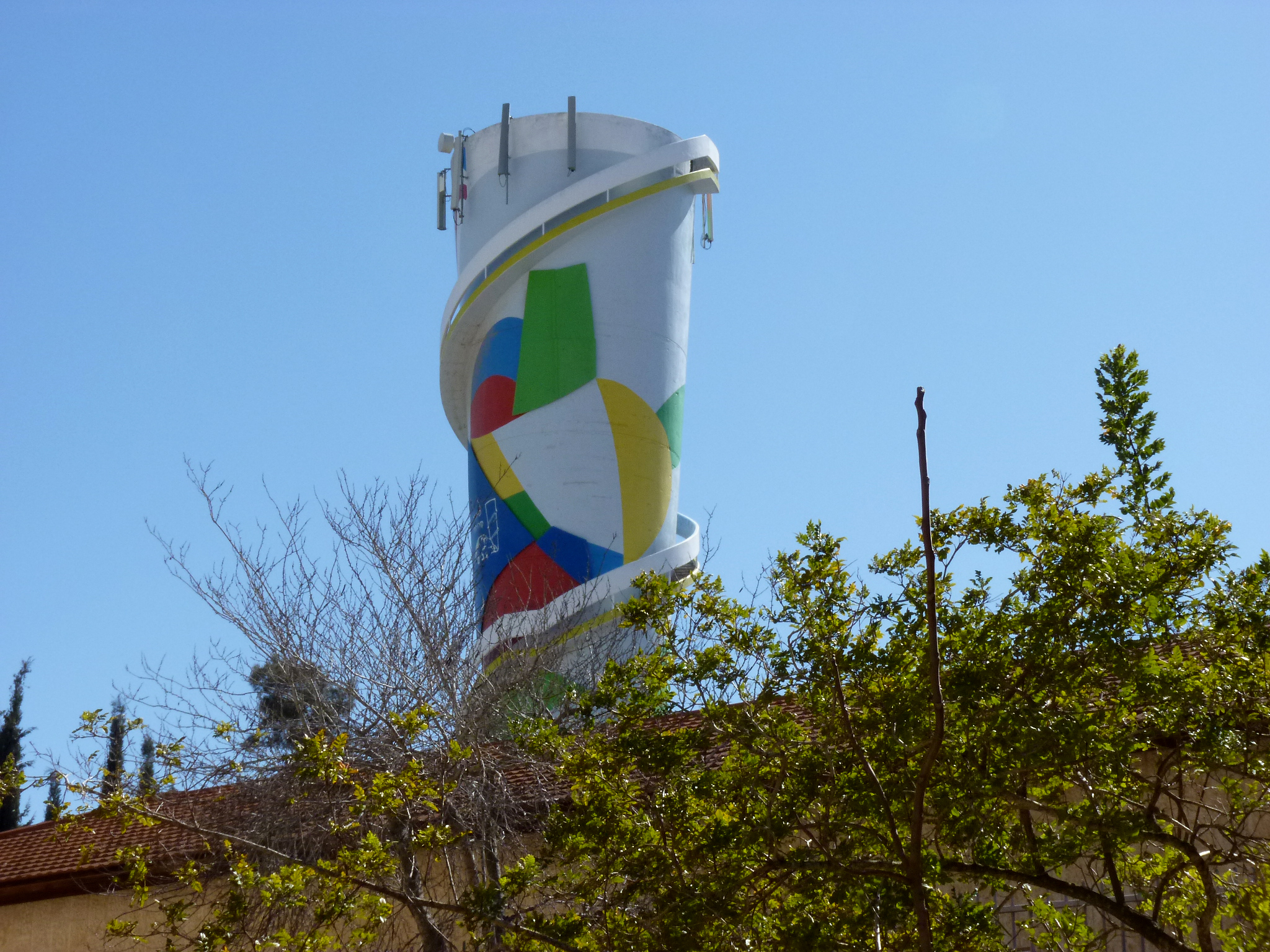
Kiryat Menachem water tower

Ganim Community Council serves the Kiryat Menachem, Ir Ganim and Givat Massuah neighborhoods.

The Community Council was established in the 1980s as part of the organization of Community Council throughout the city. The Community Council is administered by publicly elected leaders who serve as mediators between the community and the authorities. Ganim Community Council provides services in the areas of education, social services and leisure to a mixed population of various ages.

== See also ==
- Kiryat Menachem bus bombing
- Kiryat Menachem Begin
