= Ein Lavan =

Coordinates: 31.7500°N 35.1581°E

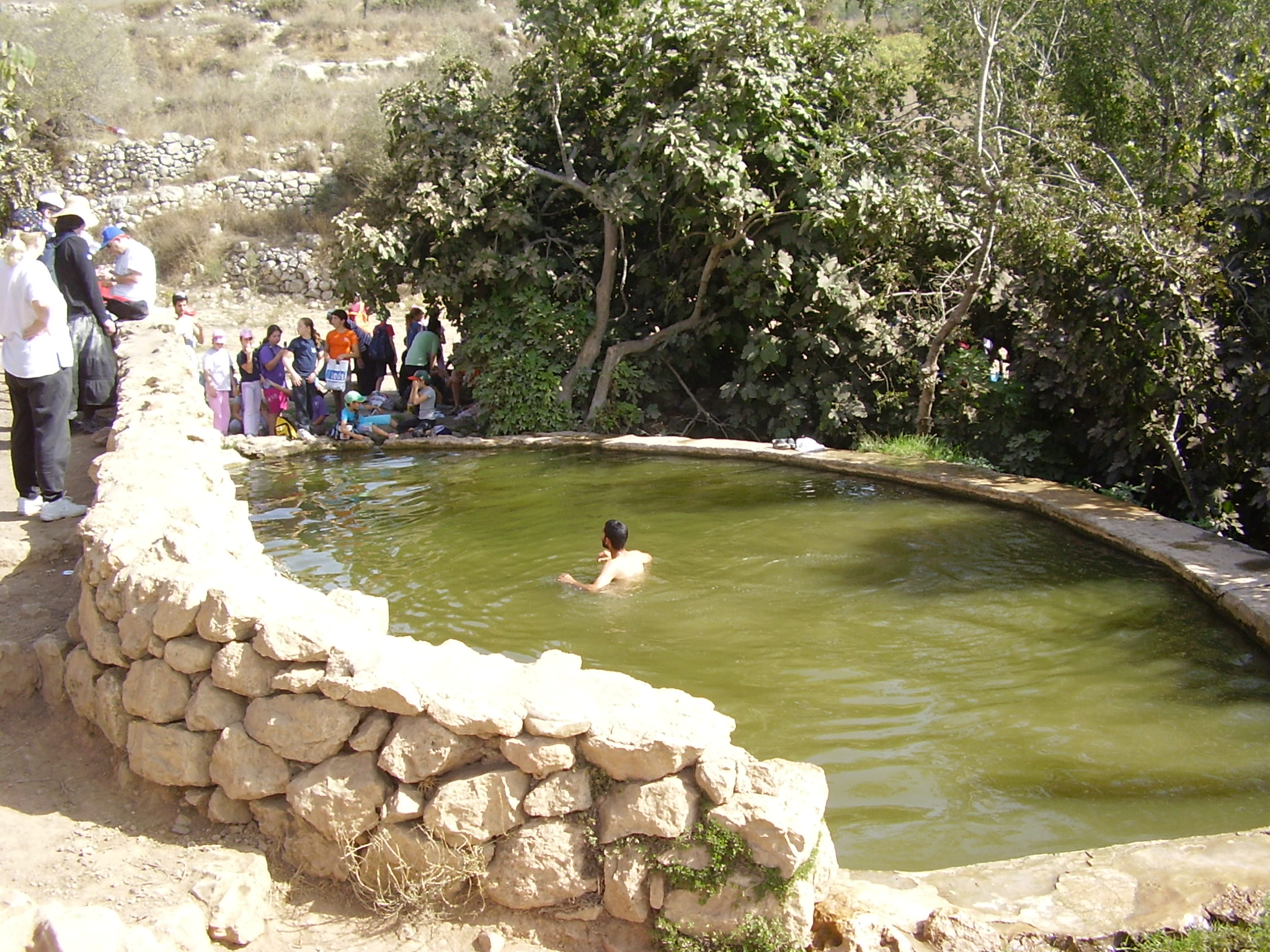
- Interactive map of Ein Lavan
- Location: Jerusalem, Israel
- Spring source: Refaim River

Ein Lavan (Hebrew: עין לבן) is a spring located in the outskirts of Jerusalem, 2 km east of the Jerusalem Biblical Zoo. It lies in the Judean Mountains.

Ein Lavan springs in the Lavan Ridge, just above the northern bank of Nahal Refaim, and is surrounded by fig trees, walnuts, almonds, carobs, olives, terebinth, and mulberry trees.

== Archaeology ==
Over the years, the Israel Antiquities Authority conducted several salvage excavations around Ein Lavan and in the valley at its foot. Archaeological remains revealed during excavations indicate the site was intensively used for agriculture since ancient times. According to the excavators, the remains are typical of the rural agricultural hinterland of the southern Levant. The uncovered remains include agricultural terraces and watchtowers, winepresses, quarries, rock-cut tombs, residential caves, irrigation canals, water pools and remains of structures.

The remains indicate that there was continuous human activity at the site from the Iron Age up until the end of the Mandatory period. The spring was used for agriculture by the inhabitants of al-Walaja. Most of the findings that were uncovered were from the Byzantine period and the early Muslim period. They include numerous mosaic stones and fragments of tiles that indicate a public building, fragments of pottery that are mostly dated to the Byzantine and early Muslim periods and a few to the Iron Age, six coins that can be identified: a coin from the years 351-361 (uncertain identification), a coin from the period of Constantine II (355-361); Two coins from the years 383–395, a coin from the Umayyad period after the reform (697-750 CE) and a Mandatory coin (mil) from 1943. In addition, several metal items were found, including a bell with an English inscription and a button of a unit of the British Army from the Mandatory period.

== Development ==
In 2015, the spring was renovated and the water pools were built and restored by the Jerusalem Municipality and the Nature and Parks Authority as part of the wider Jerusalem Park.

In September 2017, the National Council for Planning and Construction approved the construction of 4,500 housing units on the Lavan ridge above the spring. There have been several concerns raised about the planned construction in Ein Laban that would cut off the flow of water there. In March 2022, Moshe Lion, mayor of Jerusalem, decided to cancel the plan in its original form and promote another alternative that would result in construction on a third of the area that was originally intended for construction. His decision received support from most environmental organizations.
