= Kiryat HaYovel =

Neighborhood in Jerusalem on Mount Herzl

Coordinates: 31°45′27″N 35°10′40″E

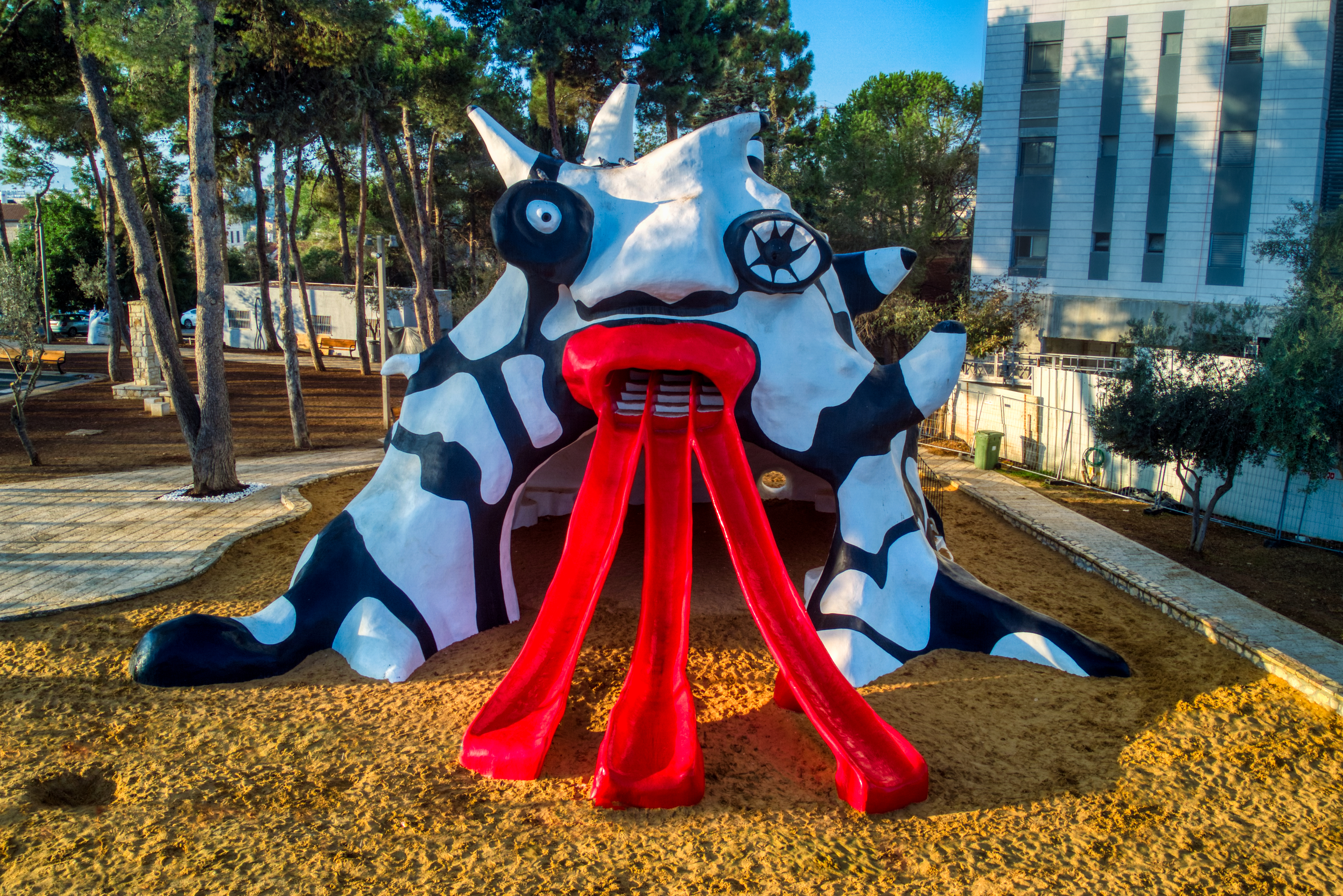
"The Golem" - monster with three red tongues, which serve as playground slides, in Kiryat HaYovel, by sculptor Niki de Saint Phalle

Kiryat HaYovel (Hebrew: קריית היובל) is a neighborhood in southwestern Jerusalem. It was built in the early 1950s to house Jewish immigrants and refugees from Europe and from Muslim countries. Today, Kiryat HaYovel has a population of 25,000 residents.

Kiryat HaYovel is located on the main road to Hadassah Hospital, Ein Kerem, between Ramat Denya and Kiryat Menachem.

== History ==
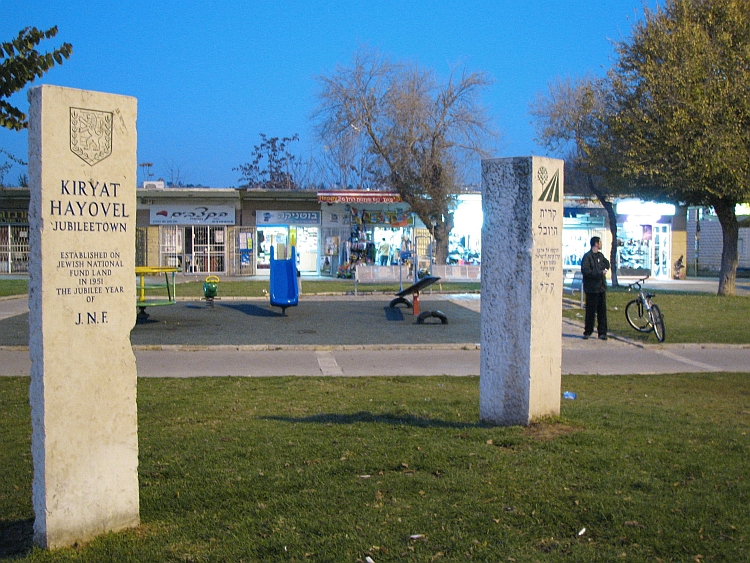
Kiryat Hayovel shopping center

Kiryat HaYovel was established in 1952 to house thousands of Jews from Arab countries who fled their homes when the State of Israel was declared. In the early days it was a tent city, as public housing projects, called shikunim, were hastily built to accommodate them.

The neighborhood was built near ruins known in Arabic as "Khirbet Beit Mazmil" ("The Stonemasons' House") and was initially named after it. There is a common misconception that the name originates from a Palestinian village of the same name that existed in the area and was abandoned during the 1948 Palestine war. However, surveys from the British Mandate era and contemporary maps, as well as earlier ones, indicate that there was no such village in the area. The name originates from the stone quarries that were located at the top of the hill and were used by the Palestinian residents of Ein Karem. Part of the area was agricultural, with olive groves present.

It was renamed Kiryat Hayovel (Jubilee Town) to commemorate the fiftieth anniversary of the Jewish National Fund.

The need for housing was so urgent that a British mandatory ordinance requiring that all buildings in Jerusalem be faced with Jerusalem stone was waived in Kiryat Hayovel. Functional architecture, with flat roofs, stucco facades and no ornamentation, was characteristic of early construction in the neighborhood, and many examples remain until today.

== Demographics ==
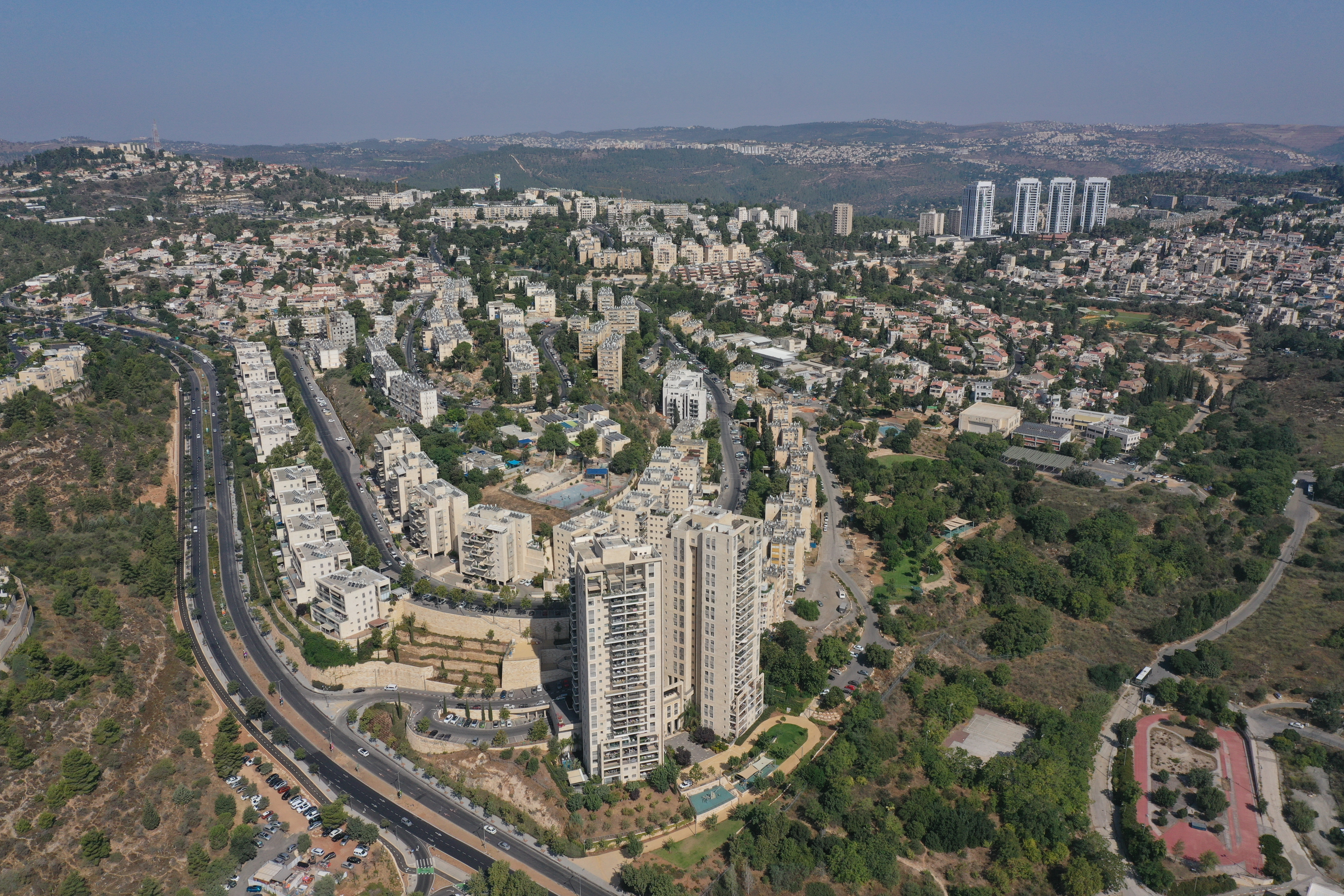
An aerial view of Kiryat Menachem and Kiryat Yovel

The neighborhood's immigrant population was gradually supplemented with young couples. In the 1960s, they were joined by teachers and professors, offsetting the proletarian character of the neighborhood and creating more upscale sections, such as the large private homes lining Shmaryahu Levin Street. In 2002, it was described as a blue-collar neighborhood.

== Terrorist incident ==
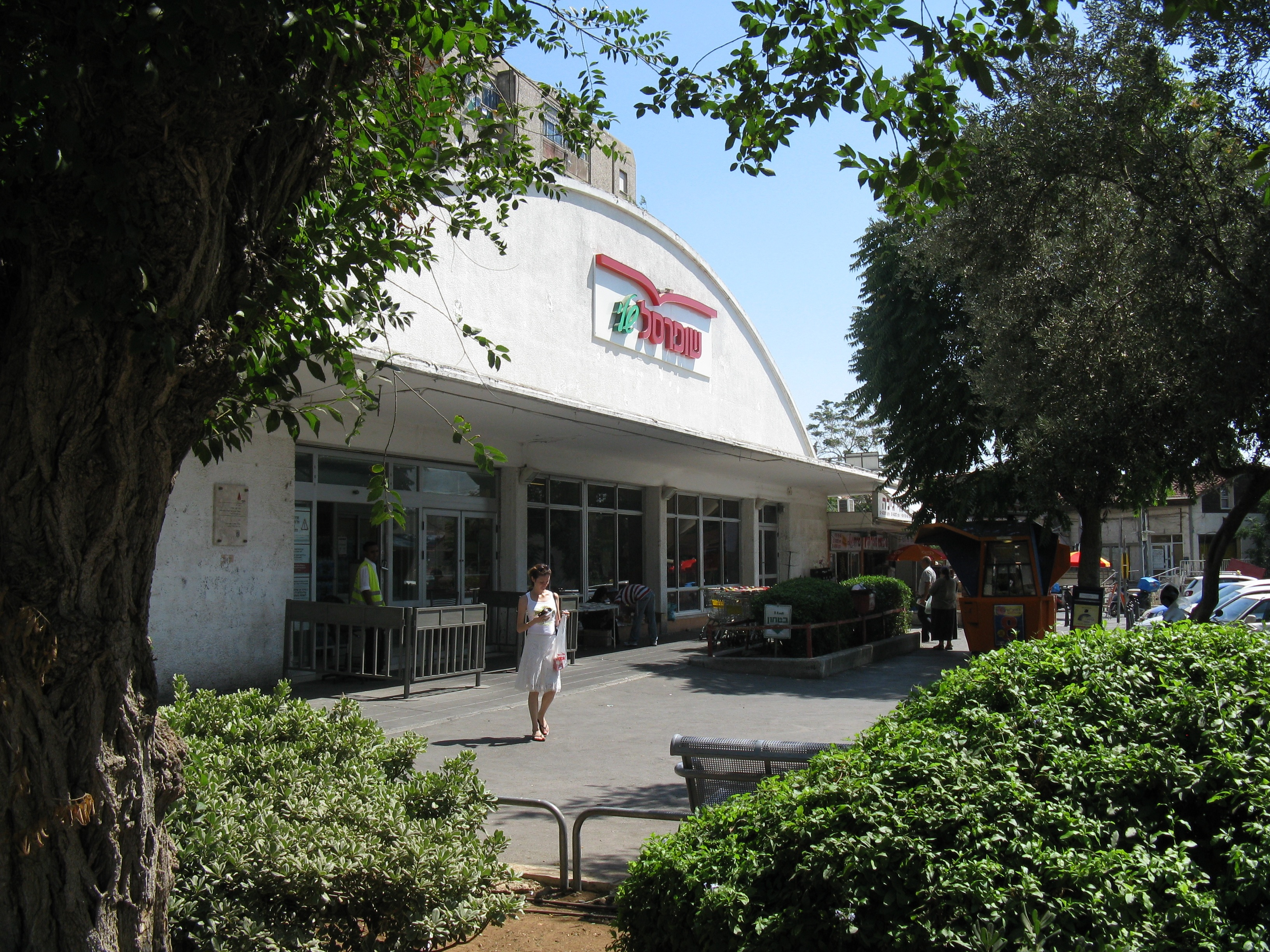
The entrance to the Kiryat HaYovel supermarket, where Akhras detonated the bomb and killed 2.

On March 29, 2002, Ayat al-Akhras, a 17-year-old Palestinian, blew herself up at the entrance of Kiryat HaYovel's main supermarket, killing two people and injuring 28.

== Culture ==
Kiryat HaYovel has a commercial center, a community center, three public swimming pools, and a library.

The neighborhood's claim to fame is "The Golem", a whimsical playground sculpture set in Rabinovich Park. Commonly called "The Monster" (Hamifletzet in Hebrew), the sculpture's three red tongues serve as slides. The Golem was designed by the French sculptor Niki de Saint-Phalle.

Many of the streets in Kiryat HaYovel are named for countries in Latin America, whose United Nations representatives voted in favor of the establishment of Israel in 1947.

== Hospitals ==
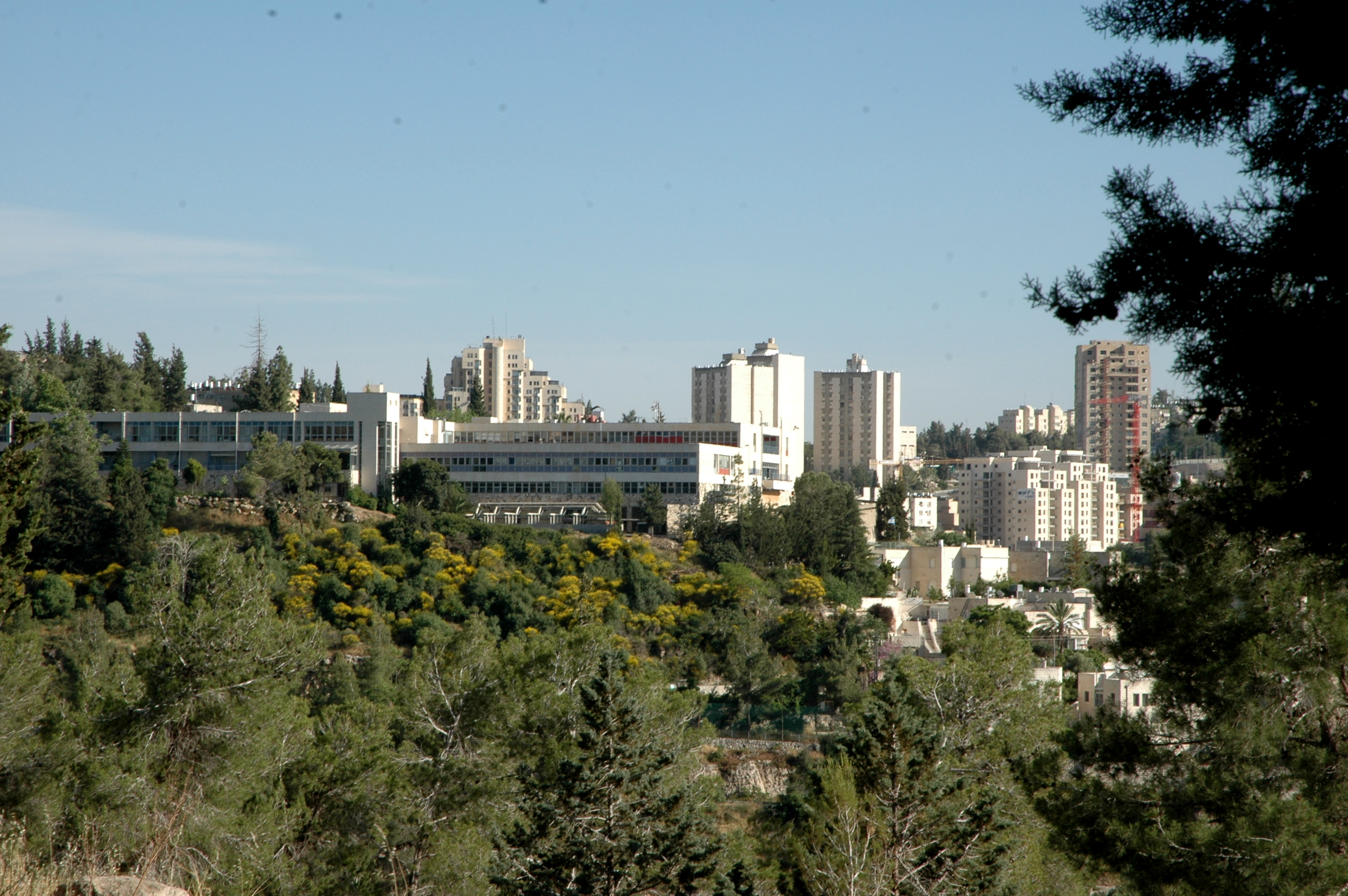
ALYN hospital

ALYN Hospital, a comprehensive rehabilitation center for physically challenged and disabled children, adolescents, and young adults, is located in Kiryat HaYovel.

== Notable residents ==
- Teddy Kollek, Mayor of Jerusalem from 1965 to 1993 lived in the neighbourhood from the mid-1990s until his death in 2007.
- Eli Ohana, soccer player
- Shlomo Helbrans, Lev Tahor founder
