= Ramat Denya =

Neighborhood in southwest Jerusalem

Coordinates: 31°45′43″N 35°10′53″E

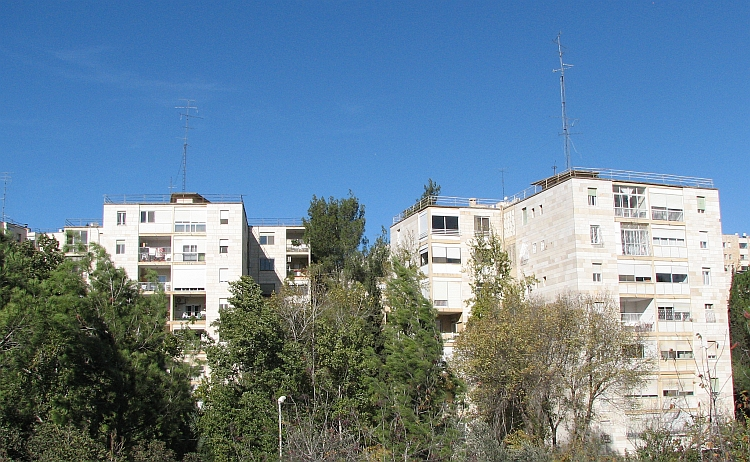
Buildings on Gelber Street, Ramat Denya

Ramat Denya (Hebrew: רמת דניה) (lit. "Denya Heights") is a neighborhood in southwest Jerusalem. It was established in 1970 between Kiryat Hayovel and Bayit Vegan, 780 meters above sea level. Denya was the name of the development company that built the first apartment buildings.

== History ==
The construction of the neighbourhood began in 1964 by the development company "Denia Company for Development Ltd." (now "Danya Cebus") and was named after it, on agricultural land from the abandoned village of Malha. Most of its residents are secular, including intellectuals, doctors, members of the Knesset, city council members, and lawyers. A small commercial center is located at the heart of the neighbourhood. It is known for its quiet atmosphere, and only in 2012 did buses begin operating there as part of a shuttle service to the light rail station at Mount Herzl. The main street is named after Aryeh Kubovy. The small neighbourhood has a few thousand residents, most of whom are retirees, and it is divided into four areas: high-rise buildings located above the park between Kubovy and Gelber streets, older private houses scattered in the heart of the neighbourhood (on Gelber, Sharam, Leibowitz, Abel Pann, and Zeitlin streets), terraced apartment buildings, and the new Ramat Dania area near Beit VeGan, consisting of semi-detached villas (on Yossi HaTzayar, Granados, Deskel, Shir LeShlomo, and Yemima streets).

== Streets ==
The streets in Ramat Denya are named for: Abel Pann (1887–1963), an artist and teacher at the Bezalel Academy of Art and Design; Aryeh (Louis) Kobovy (1896–1966) a Labor Zionist leader in Belgium and Israeli consul to Poland and Czechoslovakia; Zeitlin in memory of two brothers, Hillel (1872–1943), a philosopher and researcher of Hasidism who was killed by the Nazis, and Aharon (1898–1973), a writer and poet; Edward Gelber (1904–1971), a Canadian Zionist leader who emigrated to Israel in 1954 and his wife Hanna a notable physician and a WIZO leader in Israel; Yosef Haim Shrim (1851–1949), rabbi of the Syrian Jewish community; Zvi Leibowitz (1897–1980), a Jerusalem municipal planner who oversaw the transport of supplies to Jerusalem during the siege of 1948.

== Dania Park ==
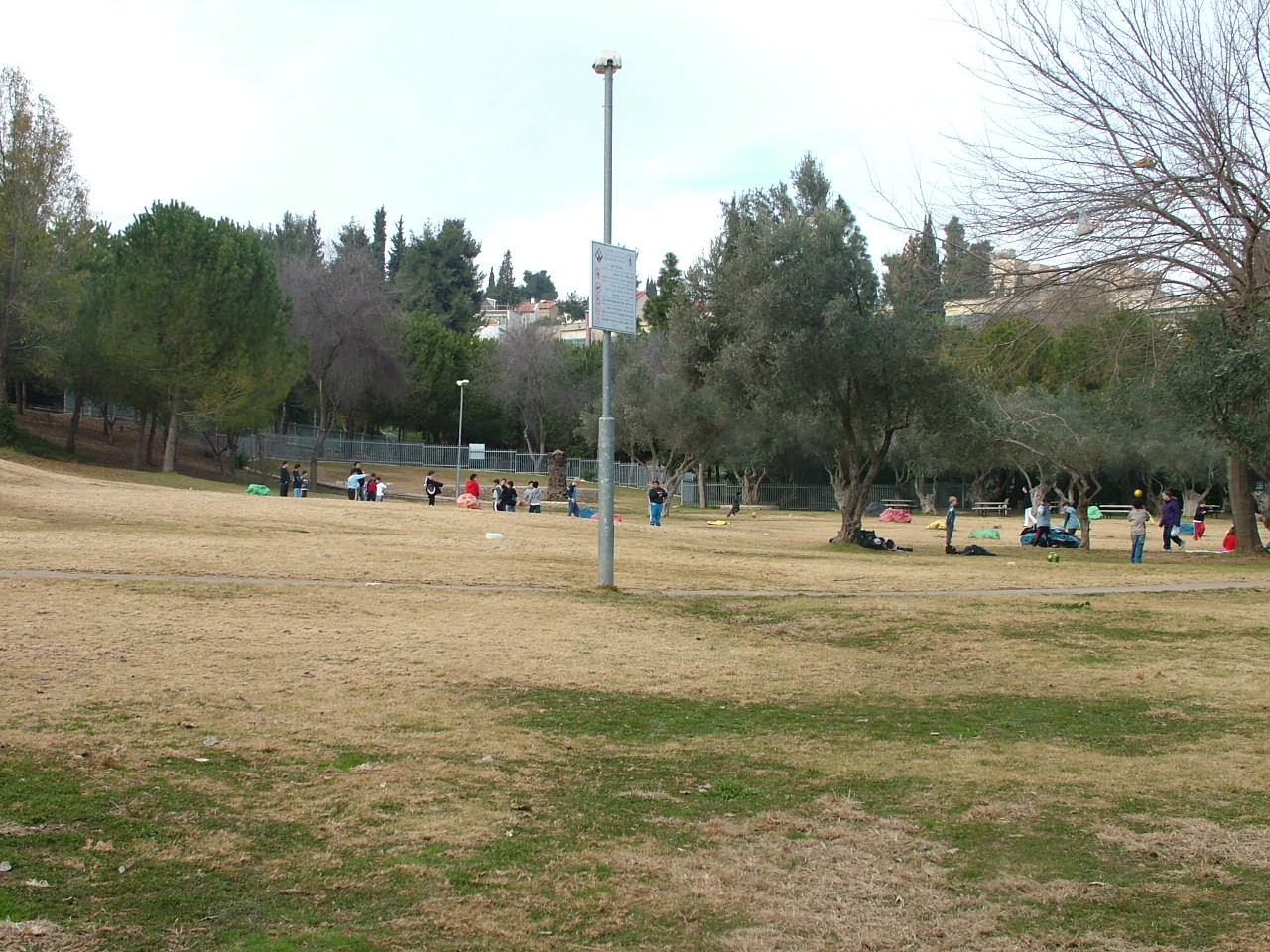
Denya park.

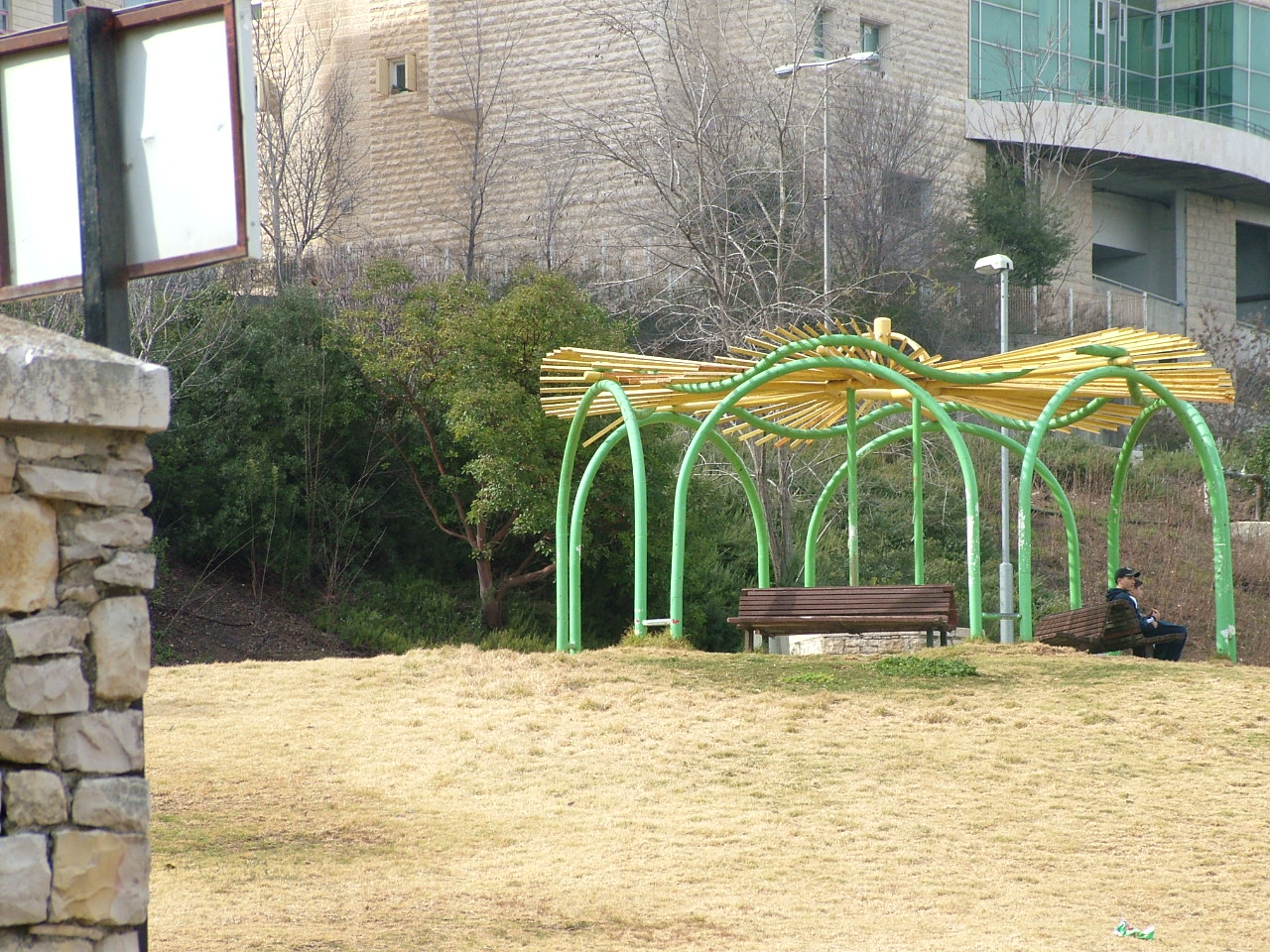
Denya park.

At the bottom of the neighbourhood is "Dania Park" (named after Fishman-Klagsborn), which features several activity areas and playgrounds. At the park's western edge, near Kiryat HaYovel, is the former training field of the Hapoel Jerusalem F.C., as well as tennis courts.

When the neighbourhood was established in 1964, the construction company "Dania" initially planned to build a waste disposal facility at the site. However, following residents' protests, the facility was relocated near the Beit Safafa neighbourhood. The land designated for the facility remained undeveloped and later became part of Dania Park.

In the early 2000s, developer Beni Nehemia proposed building a 25,000-square-meter commercial center on this land. Ultimately, between 2011 and 2014, the site was used for a project named "Pearl in the Forest," consisting of four 9-story residential towers. The construction company responsible for the project was Danya Cebus, the successor of "Dania Company for Development," which originally built the neighbourhood.

== Notable residents ==
- Shlomo Hillel
- Yotam Ottolenghi - chef and TV presenter
