= Givat Massuah =

Neighborhood in southwestern Jerusalem

Givat Massuah גבעת משואה
- Neighborhood
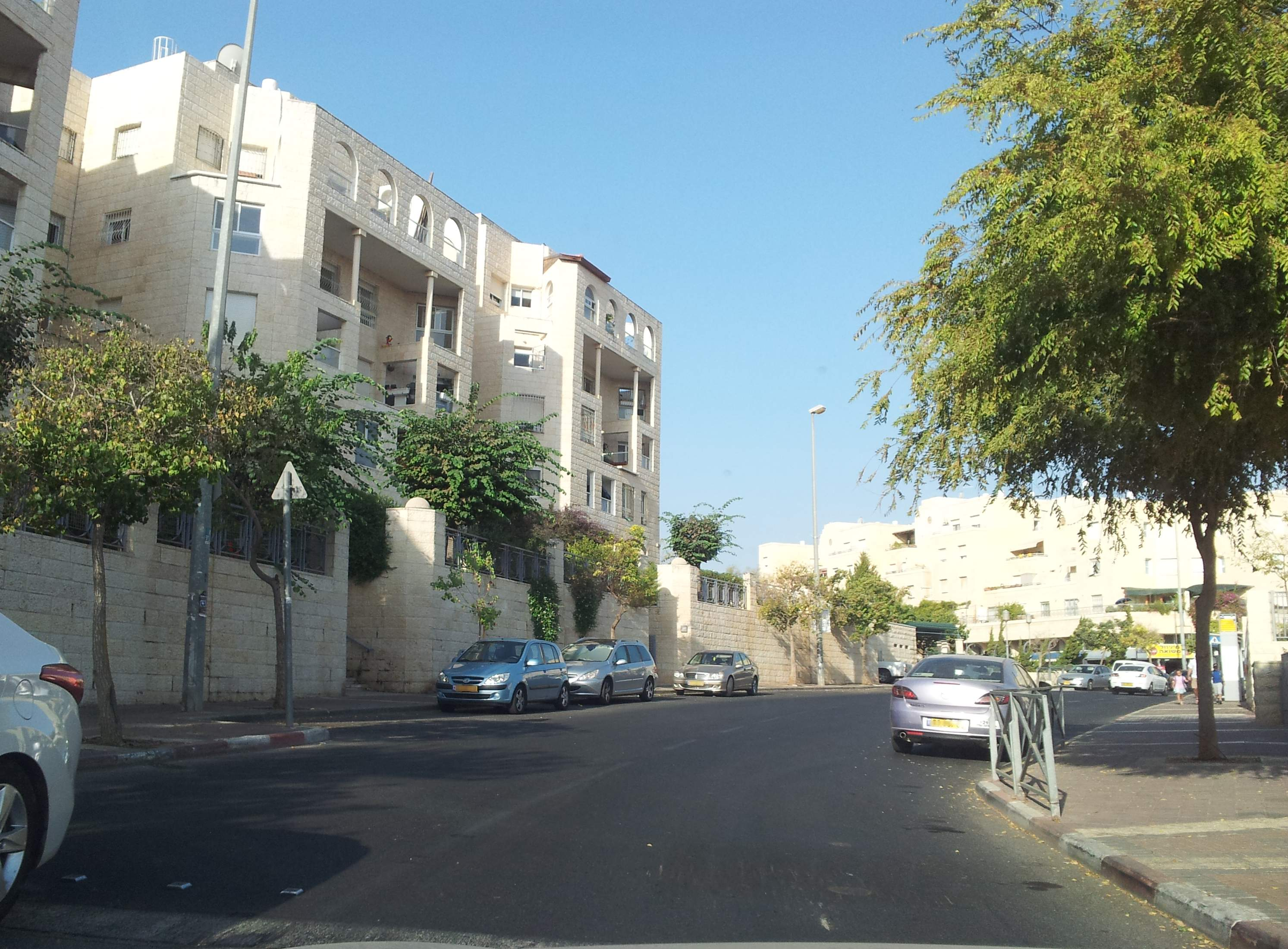
- A street in Givat Massuah

- Location in Jerusalem
- City: Jerusalem
- Established: 1996

Population
  - Total: 1,100 families

Givat Massuah (Hebrew: גבעת משואה, lit. 'Beacon Hill') is a new neighborhood in the southwest outskirts of Jerusalem, overlooking Malha and the Rekhes Lavan valley. It has a population of 1,100 families, mainly secular and Orthodox Jews.

Established in 1996, Givat Massuah is built in a modern style and has many parks, trees and playgrounds. Local services include a grocery store, barber shop and bakery, alongside two medical facilities, several kindergartens and an elementary school, three Orthodox synagogues, a Bnei Akiva and a Scouting branch.

== History ==
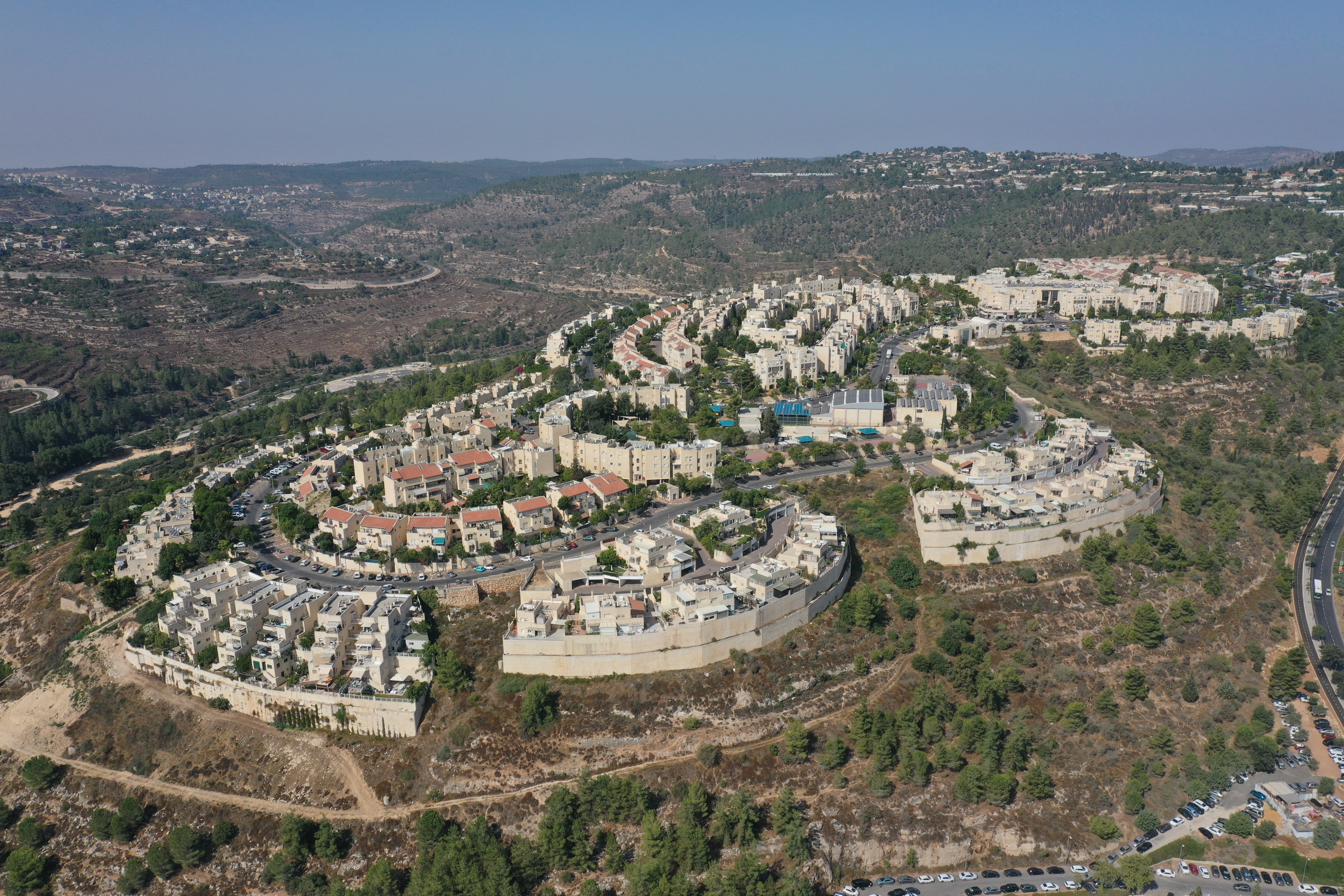
An aerial view of the neighbourhood

The planning of the neighbourhood began in 1974 by the Ministry of Housing as part of a five-year plan to add 30,000 housing units in Jerusalem. After the plan prioritized development in northern Jerusalem, including the establishment of the Pisgat Ze'ev neighbourhood, the construction of this neighbourhood was postponed. Actual construction began in the early 1990s.

In 2012, the National Housing Committee (Va’adat Diyur Leumi) for the Jerusalem District approved the "Moradot Meso'a" plan, which proposed building 490 housing units in the area between Givat Massuah and the Biblical Zoo, near the zoo’s fence. An expert opinion submitted on behalf of the zoo warned that construction could endanger the animals due to lighting, noise, and pollution. Opponents of the plan also provided expert opinions highlighting various risks to the physical and mental well-being of the zoo’s residents. In April 2017, the Jerusalem District Court rejected the construction plan due to potential harm to the animals’ living conditions.

In 2015, the film Abulele was filmed in the neighbourhood.

In May 2019, the Jerusalem Local Planning and Building Committee approved a plan to build 706 housing units in 21 buildings, one of which was planned to be 31 stories tall, on the neighbourhood’s last available land reserves in its northern section.
