= List of bus routes in Jerusalem =

There are hundreds bus lines in Jerusalem that are a vital part of the public transportation from/to Jerusalem and whitin Jerusalem and the nearby suburbs along with the Light Rail.

Local bus service within Jerusalem

Jerusalem is served by 97 local bus lines that operate across all neighborhoods throughout the day. In addition, four lines operate only in the peak direction during designated hours.

There is two seasonal and holiday line (Route 111), which operates between Malcha and the Kotel and line ( Route 222 ) which operates between givat hamivtar light rail station and the Kotel, during the summer and holiday periods. Another route, Line 580, operates exclusively on weekends and holidays.

Several bus lines operate with alternative route variations at different times of the day. These variations are identified by the א (Aleph) designation next to the route number, indicating an alternative routing.

Suburban Bus Lines

The suburban bus network serving the Jerusalem area consists of 39 routes linking surrounding suburban communities with Jerusalem. Of these, three routes operate in a single direction only, while twelve function as peak-direction commuter services.

Most routes terminate at one of two principal hubs: Binyanei HaUma, adjacent to the city’s central Station, or Haarazim bus terminal, located at Ramot junction.

In addition to the primary suburban services, each of the served communities is connected by at least one peak-direction route to the Talpiot Industrial Area.

Intercity Bus Lines

There are 230 intercity bus lines in operation that allow connection to virtually anywhere in the country, Of these, 44 lines operate exclusively on weekends and holidays and typically depart from locations within the city rather than from a central bus terminal.

Additionally: • 7 lines operate in only one direction • 9 lines operate exclusively in the peak travel direction

Most lines that do not operate solely on weekends or in peak direction depart from one of three main terminals: 1. Central Station – Primarily serves long-distance destinations 2. Binyanei HaUma Terminal – Primarily serves short-distance destinations 3. HaArizim Bus Terminal – Primarily serves destinations frequently used by the Ultra-Orthodox community

Line 480 normally operates directly from Central Station to Tel Aviv during morning hours. However, additional morning departures operate from multiple neighborhoods throughout the city as alternative Line 480 services. Late-night services on this line operate from Mamilla to Reading Terminal.

Line 485 operates to Ben Gurion Airport on Tuesday nights / Wednesday mornings only, when rail service is unavailable. During these hours, it is the only public transportation option from Jerusalem to the airport.

Due to security requirements: • Reinforced (stone-resistant) buses are used on routes serving Gush Etzion, Ariel, and the Binyamin region • Bullet-resistant buses are used on routes serving the Hebron and Shomron regions

Night bus lines

There are 20 night lines that only operate on weekends, summer and holidays There are 4 night lines that are just Extensions of the regular route Night line 480 is a extend version of the route that operates during the day and also operates every night

Special bus lines

There are 10 lines that only operate a few days a year to help overcrowding when passenger Volume is expected to be very high.

Most bus lines run from Sunday to Thursday, with special hours on Fridays and Saturdays depending on Shabbat entry and exit times.

== Local Jerusalem bus lines ==
The local public buses are run by three operators. Service begins at 4:15 and goes until 2:00 most lines operate 5:30-12:00 Egged which runs the Southern Jerusalem lines, Superbus which runs the Central Jerusalem and Trunk lines and Extra Public Transportation which runs the Northern Jerusalem lines.

Line	Operator	Places	Notes
1	Extra	(Circular route) Kiryat HaMemshala – Jerusalem CBS – Malkhei Yisrael St. – Mea Shearim St. – Damascus Gate – Western Wall – HaNevi'im St. – Straus St. – Malkhei Yisrael Street – Jerusalem CBS	Articulated buses are used on this route.; Alternatives from har nof, Ramat Shlomo, bait Va-gan, Neve Ya’akov, every Saturday night and holidays.
2	Superbus	Tzahal Square (Circular route). via the Jewish Quarter and the Western Wall	Minibuses are used on this route
3/3א	Extra	(Circular route)Kiryat HaMemshala – Jerusalem CBS – Romema – Kiryat Mattersdorf – Kiryat Sanz – Shmuel HaNavi St. – Western Wall – Shmuel HaNavi St. – Kiryat Sanz – Kiryat Mattersdorf – Romema – Jerusalem CBS	Articulated buses are used on this route.; 2 alternative trips from har nof every weekday morning; alternative from Ramot on Saturday night; 3א services Grosberg st
4	Egged	Har Homa - Gilo	One way only towards Gilo with 2 trips per day in the morning
5	Egged	Ramat Beit HaKerem – Yefe Nof light rail – Beit HaKerem - Moshe Kol St. – Givat Mordechai – Pat Intersection – Talpiot – Har Homa	
6/6א	Egged	(Circular route) Malha Mall – Pat Intersection – Givat Mordechai – Jerusalem CBS – Givat Mordechai – Pat Intersection – Malha Mall	6א runs between Malcha Mall and central station direct and only operates on nights when sporting events are happening near Malcha mall
7	Egged	Givat Ram – Kiryat HaMemshala – Betzalel St. – King George St. - Keren Hayesod St. – Hebron Rd. (Bethlehem Rd. on return) – Ramat Rachel	7א to the USA Embassy has been permanently cancelled On September 15, 2025, The line will not serve the Jaffa-Center and HaDavidka light rail stations or Ki'akh and Aliash streets
8	Egged	(Circular route) Talpiyot - Katamon – HaRakevet Rd - Bethlehem Rd - King David St. - Keren Hayesod St. – Talbiya - The German Colony - Katamon – Talpiyot	route to be operated by minibuses Route to begin service on July 7, 2025
9/9א	Egged	Kiryat HaMemshala – Kiryat Balza - Romama Ilit - Kiryat Tzanz - Strauss - Mahane Yahuda - Rehavia - Givat Ram - Givat Mordechai – Malha Mall	9א operates 2 trips in the morning between central station and Givat Ram
10	Egged	Mount Herzl - Kiryat Yovel - Ramat Denya - Katamon - Talpiyot	
12	Egged	Mordot Arnona - Talpiyot – Pat Intersection – Malha Mall – Kiryat Yovel – Givat Massua – Ir Ganim – Kiriyat Menachem – Hadassah Medical Center	the route has been extended to Mordot Arnona, from Friday March 27, 2026
14	Egged	Jerusalem CBS – Kiryat Hamemshala (Knesset) – Givat Ram – Katamon – Malha Mall	significant line changes starting July 7, 2025
15	Egged	(Circular route) Talpiyot - Katamon - Emek Hamatzlevah - Jerusalem CBS - Emek Hamatzlevah - Rasko - Katamon - Talpiyot	Articulated buses are used on this route
16	Egged	Bayit Vegan – Herzl Blvd. – Kiryat Moshe – Romama Ilit – Shikun Chabad – Bar Ilan St. – Sanhedria – Golda Meir Blvd. – Ha’arazim central bus terminal	Midday service also goes on Petah Tikva, Shamgar, and Yirmiyahu streets
17	Egged	Givat Massuah – Malha – Malha Mall – Golomb St. – Ussishkin St. – Aza (Gaza) Rd. – Ali’ash – HaNeviim St. – American Colony – Mount Scopus	On September 15, 2025, The lines will not serve the King George/Ben Yehuda station and the Jaffa - Center/King George light rail Station
18	Egged	Malha Railway Station – Malha Mall – Yo’ezer st - Katamon – Jabotinsky st – King David St – - HaNevi’im St – Mahane Yehuda Market – Jerusalem CBS	On September 15, 2025, The line will not serve Keren HaYesod and King George Streets, or the Jaffa-Center Station
19/19א	Egged	Har HaTzofim (Mount Scopus) – Bar Lev St – HaNevi’im St – Ali’ash – Betzalel St.- Ussishkin St. – Aza (Gaza) / Herzog St. – Golomb St. – Ein Kerem Hadassah Medical Center	19א towards Har HaTzofim (Mount Scopus) does not go on to Ramban and Ussishkin streets; 19א from Har HaTzofim (Mount Scopus) goes on Bar Lev and agron streets and ends service at pat junction will be cancelled September 15, 2025; There are two Am trips from Gilo to Ein Kerem Hadassah Medical Center; On September 15, 2025, The lines will not serve the King George/Ben Yehuda station and the Jaffa - Center/King George light rail Station
20	Egged	(Circular route)Givat Massuah – Ir Ganim – Kiriyat Menachem – Kiryat Yovel – Har Hezl Light rail station - Kiryat Yovel - Kiriyat Menachem – Ir Ganim – Givat Massuah	as of September 2, 2025 the line will no longer go to central station
21	Egged	Ramat Beit HaKerem – Yeffe Nof light rail station – Bayit VeGan – Ramat Sharet - Mount Herzl Light Rail Station –	as of September 2, 2025 the line will no longer go to central station and will resume service in Beit HaKerem As well as no longer being a Circular route
22/22א	Egged	Pisgat Ze'ev – French Hill Junction – Ramat Eshkol – Maalot Dafna - Geula – Betzalel St.- Ali’ash – Shlomzion St. – Rehavia – Rasco – San Simon – Katamonim – Pat – Talpiot bus terminal	22א runs one trip each weekday morning that ends at hadasa college from talpiot On September 15, 2025, the line will operate via HaDavidka Square and Aliash Street and Shmuel HaNagid Street, and will not serve the Jaffa - Center and King George/ Ben Yehuda Stations
23/23א	Egged	(Circular route)Polinski high school - Ir Ganim - Kiryat Yovel - Bayit VeGan - Kiryat Yovel - Ir Ganim - Polinski high school	The 23א enters Borochov and Gordon streets and only runs 7:24-8:00
24	Egged	(Circular route) Ramat Denya - Kiryat Yovel - Har Hezl Light Rail Station - Kiryat Yovel - Ramat Denya	as of September 2, 2025 the line will no longer go to central station
25/25א	Extra	Jerusalem CBS – Machaneh Yehudah – Straus St. – Kikar HaShabbat – Ramat Eshkol – Neve Yaakov	25א operates 2 trips late night and serves Pisgat Ze'ev besides the regular line As of July 28, 2025 the line no longer services Gesher Hameitarim
26/26א	Egged	(Circular route)Biblical Zoo(bus 26א only) – Ramat Denya – Bayit VeGan – Yad Vashem & Mount Herzl – Kiryat Yovel – Ramat Sharet – Ramat Denya – Biblical Zoo(bus 26א only)	26א Operates to the Biblical Zoo
27/27א	Egged	Central Station - Haturim light rail station - Central Station - Gesher Hameitarim - Yeffe Nof light rail station – Mount Herzl – Kiryat Yovel – Hadassah Hospital – Even Sapir (27א only)	Trips towards Even Sapir are labeled as 27א. Trips from Even Sapir labeled like the normal 27. The line will not return to its original route prior to the light rail shutdown and will permanently remain to central station
28	Egged	Ein Karem - Mount Herzl - Beit HaKerem - Shaarei Tzedek Hospital	selected trips do not go on Shalva Rd
29	Egged	(Circular route)Givat Massuah - Ir Ganim - Kiryat Menachem - Kiryat Yovel - Har Hezl Light Rail Station - Kiryat Yovel Kiryat Menachem - Ir Ganim - Givat Massuah	as of September 2, 2025 the line will no longer go to central station
30/30א	Egged	Mount Scopus – Bar Lev St – Hebron Road (bus 30א) – (Circular route)Talpiot – Tunnels Junction – Gilo	30א operates rush hours peak direction only trips towards Gilo are labeled 30.
31	Superbus	Gilo – Malha Mall – Begin Expressway – Jerusalem CBS – Begin Expressway – Ramot	Articulated buses are used on this route; Selected morning trips bypass Malcha Mall in the Ramot direction only
33	Egged	Har Nof – Beit HaDfus St. – Kiryat Moshe – Herzl Blvd. – Kikar Holland – Bayit Vegan – Ramat Sharett – Malha Mall – Malha Railway Station – Gilo	midday service goes to the Biblical Zoo and selected night trips go on Ha-Mekhanekhet st On November 4 2025, The line will not serve Shaulson, Hay Tayeb and Rosental streets in the Har Nof direction for about 4 months
34	Egged	Mount Scoups – Ammunition Hill – Ma'alot Dafna – Yehezkel St.- HaNevi’im St – Shivtei Yisroel St - King David St. – ( Bethlehem Rd straight to Talpiyot on return ) Emek Refaim – Rachel Imenu – Talpiyot	On September 15, 2025, The line will not serve Keren HaYesod and King George Streets, or the Jaffa-Center Station
35	Egged	Malha Railway Station – Malha Mall - Malha - Ramat Denya - Kiryat Yovel - Bayit VeGan - Mount Herzl - Kiryat Moshe - Givat Ram - Kiryat HaMemshala	
36	Extra	(Circular route) Ramot – Ramot Junction – Atirot Mada – Kiryat Sanz – Straus St. – Kiryat Sanz – Atirot Mada – Ramot Junction – Ramot	Articulated buses are used on this route
38/38א	Superbus	(Circular route)Jewish Quarter – Western Wall – Old Train Station – King George St. – Jaffa Road – Shlomzion St. – Jaffa Gate – Armenian Quarter – Zion Gate – Jewish Quarter	Minibuses are used on this route; 38א is a holiday season version of line 38 and does not enter the old city
39/39א	Egged	Ha’arazim central bus terminal – Sanhedria – Ramat Eshkol – Bar Ilan Junc. – Geula – Jerusalem CBS – Beit HaKerem – Mount Herzl – Bayit Vegan	39א operates in the Ha’arazim central bus terminal only
40	Extra	Ammunition Hill – Ramat Eshkol - Atirot Mada - Atirot Mada Industrial Zone	Operates on Weekdays rush hours only. In mornings towards Atirot Mada and in evenings towards Ammunition Hill.
42/42א	Egged	Hadassah Medical Center (Ein Kerem) – Tzomet Pat – Givat Ram (Hebrew University) – Ramot Junction - French Hill – Mount Scopus	operates Weekdays only until 20:25; 42א operates between Hadassah Medical Center and Givat Ram
44	Extra	Pisgat Ze'ev only	
45	Extra	Jerusalem CBS – Machaneh Yehudah – Straus St. – Kikar HaShabbat – Ramat Eshkol – Neve Yaakov Mizrach – Pisgat Ze'ev	As of July 28, 2025 the line no longer services Gesher Hameitarim
46	Extra	Neve Yaakov - Pisgat Ze'ev - French Hill junction - Highway 1 - Ramot Junction - Atirot Mada	Peak direction service only As of November 4 2025 the line now goes down Harav Pardes st
47	Extra	Pisgat Ze'ev only	
48/48א	Extra	(Circular route) Ammunition hill – Mt Scopus – Ammunition hill	Route 48א operates on Buber Street
49	Superbus	Neve Yaakov - Pisgat Ze'ev - Ammunition Hill - Bar lev at - King David St. - German Colony - Talpiyot- Hebron Road	significant line changes starting July 7, 2025 As of September 4, 2025 light rail alternative station at Ammunition hill will remain a permanent stop
50	Egged	(Circular route) Beit HaKerem - Kiryat Moshe – Jerusalem CBS - Kiryat Moshe – Beit HaKerem	Minibuses are used on this route
51	Extra	Mekor Baruch - Romama - Romama Ilit - Sorozkin - Kiryat Tzanz - Shmuel HaNavi St. - Mount Of Olives	Operates on Weekdays only. 3 trips each direction per day.
52	Extra	Ammunition Hill - Ramat Eshkol - Sahandria - Kiryat Tzanz - Sorozkin - Romama Ilit - Givat Shaul - Har Nof	Evening service goes on Beit Hadfus st
53/53א	Extra	Neve Yaakov - Pisgat Ze'ev - French Hill - Mount Scopus	53א does not enter the French hill return trips are labeled 53
54/54א	Extra	Har HaMenuchot Cemetery – Har Nof Terminal - Givat Shaul – Jerusalem CBS – Shamgar - Kiryat Tzanz – Atirot Mada – Ha’arazim central bus terminal	line 54א will begin operating on December 26 and will operate on Saturday nights only Line 54א does not enter Atirot Mada and continues on Golda Meir
55	Extra	(Circular route) Har Nof - Givat Shaul – Yirmeyahu St. – Yehezkel St. – Moshe Zaks - Yehezkel St. – Yirmeyahu St. – Givat Shaul – Har Nof	Articulated buses are used on this route On November 4 2025, The line will not serve Shaulson, Hay Tayeb and Rosental streets in the Zachs Square direction for about 4 months
56	Extra	(Circular route) Ramat Shlomo – Highway 1 – Ramot Junction – Golda Meir Blvd. – Shmuel HaNavi St. – Yehezkel St. – Straus St. – Yehezkel St. – Shmuel HaNavi St. – Golda Meir Blvd. – Highway 1 – Ramot Junction – Ramat Shlomo	Articulated buses are used on this route
57	Extra	Ha’arazim central bus terminal - Golda Meir Blvd. – Kiryat Tzanz - Sorotzkin - Romama - Ramat Shlomo	Articulated buses are used on this route
59	Extra	(Circular route) Neve Yaakov Mizrach – Neve Yaakov – Ramat Eshkol – Bar Ilan St. – Tzfania St. – Yehezkel St. – Straus St. – Yehezkel St. – Ezra St. – Bar Ilan St. – Ramat Eshkol – Neve Yaakov – Neve Yaakov Mizrach	Articulated buses are used on this route
60	Extra		
61	Extra	Ramot - Ramot Junction – Highway 1 – French Hill - Mount Scopus	as of September 3, 2025 the line will enter the givat hamivtar light rail station
62	Superbus	(Circular route). Ramot – Ramot Junction – Begin Expressway – Jerusalem CBS – Machaneh Yehudah – Jerusalem CBS – Begin Expressway - Ramot	Articulated buses are used on this route
63	Extra	Ramot (Circular route)	
64/64א	Extra	Har Nof terminal - Givat Shaul - Jerusalem CBS - Romama - Atirot Mada - Ramot Junction – Ramot	64א run between Ramot and Givat Shaul using Begin Expressway in the Givat Shaul direction only; morning service goes down Kanfei Nesharim st evening service goes on Beit Hadfus st in the Ramot direction only
65	Extra	Har Nof terminal – Givat Shaul – Jerusalem CBS – Yirmeyahu St. – Bar Ilan St. – Levi Eshkol Blvd. – Pisgat Ze'ev	morning service goes down Kanfei Nesharim st evening service goes on Beit Hadfus st
66/66א	Extra	Givat Ram – Kiryat HaMemshala – Jerusalem CBS – Mahane Yehuda Market – HaNeviim St. – Bar Lev St. – Pisgat Ze'ev	66א does not go down Nedava st As of September 4, 2025 light rail alternative station at Ammunition hill will remain a permanent stop
67/67א	Extra	Har Nof terminal - Givat Shaul - Jerusalem CBS - Yirmeyahu St. – Bar Ilan Junction - Ramot junction– Ramat Shlomo	Articulated buses are used on this route.; 67א operates between Ramat Shlomo and givat shual using Begin Expressway in the givat shual direction only
68	Extra	Mount Scopus - French Hill - Ramat Eshkol - Bar Ilan - Yirmeyahu St. – Jerusalem CBS - Givat Ram	Articulated buses are used on this route as of September 3, 2025 the line will enter the givat hamivtar light rail station
69	Extra	Har Nof terminal - Givat Shaul - Yirmeyahu St. – Bar Ilan - ammunition hill - Neve Yaakov	Articulated buses are used on this route
70	Extra	Jerusalem CBS – Shikun Chabad – Bar Ilan Junc. – French Hill Junction – Pisgat Ze'ev – Central Command	Operates on Weekdays rush hours only. Three trips in the morning towards Central Command and four trips on Sundays and one trip in evening towards the CBS.
71	Superbus	Gilo - Givat HaMatos Junction - Hebron Road - Old Train Station - King David St. – Shivtei Yisroel St - HaNevi’im St – Strauss - Ramot Junction – Ramot	Articulated buses are used on this route On September 15, 2025, The line will not serve Keren HaYesod and King George Streets, or the Jaffa-Center Station
72	Superbus	Gilo - Givat HaMatos Junction - Hebron Road - Old Train Station - Keren Hayesod St. – Ali’ash – HaNevi’im St – Strauss - Ramot Junction – Ramot	Articulated buses are used on this route On September 15, 2025, the line will operate via HaDavidka Square and Aliash Street and Shmuel HaNagid Street, and will not serve the Jaffa - Center and King George/ Ben Yehuda Stations
74	Superbus	Har Nof – Jerusalem CBS – Mahane Yehuda Market – HaNevi’im St – Shivtei Yisroel St – King David St. – Chan Theater - Hebron Rd – Har Homa	Articulated buses are used on this route On November 4 2025, The line will not serve Shaulson, Hay Tayeb and Rosental streets in the Har Nof direction for about 4 months
75	Superbus	Har Nof terminal – Jerusalem CBS – Mahane Yehuda Market( Betsal’el St on return ) – Ali’ash – Keren Hayesod St. – Chan Theater – Hebron Rd - Har Homa	Articulated buses are used on this route On September 15, 2025, the line will operate from Agripas Street via Aliash Street and Shmuel HaNagid Street and will not serve the HaDavidka Square/HaNevi'im and Jaffa - Center Stations
77/77א	Superbus	Malha Mall - Katamon - The German Colony - Keren Hayesod St. – Ali’ash – HaNevi’im St - Strauss - Ramat Eshkol - French Hill	77א services Ha-Khayil st On September 15, 2025, the line will operate via HaDavidka Square and Aliash Street and Shmuel HaNagid Street, and will not serve the Jaffa - Center and King George/ Ben Yehuda Stations
78	Superbus	Jerusalem CBS – Mahane Yehuda Market( Betsal’el St on return ) – Ali’ash – Keren Hayesod St. – Chan Theater – Hebron Rd - East Talpiyot	On September 15, 2025, the line will operate from Agripas Street via Aliash Street and Shmuel HaNagid Street and will not serve the HaDavidka Square/HaNevi'im and Jaffa - Center Stations
81	Extra	Ramot - Ramot Junction – Highway 1 – Pisgat Ze’ev - Neve Yaakov	As of November 11 2025 the service hours on the line have been extended to 12:50
82	Superbus	(Circular route) Nof Zion - East Talpiyot - Nof Zion	Minibuses are used on this route The line no longer goes to Abu Tour and instead turns around on Albeck
83/83א	Superbus	(Circular route) Ma'ale HaZeitim – Western Wall – Jaffa Gate – Safra Square – Armenian Quarter – Zion Gate – Jewish Quarter – Western Wall - Ma'ale HaZeitim	Minibuses are used on this route Route 83א enters the western wall when coming from Ma'ale HaZeitim
84	Extra	Ammunition hill (Circular route). via Mount Olives	Operates on Weekdays only
85	Extra	Ramat Shlomo – Highway 1 – Neve Yaakov	
86	Extra	Ramot - Ramot Junction – Highway 1 – Ramat Shlomo	
87	Extra	(Circular route) Ammunition Hill Light Rail Station – French Hill – Highway 1 – Ramat Shlomo – Route 1 – Givat Hamivtar – Ammunition Hill Light Rail Station	as of September 4, 2025 the line will enter the givat hamivtar light rail station and will no longer go to ammunition hill
88	Egged	(Circular route) Talpiyot - Mordot Arnona - East Talpiyot – Hebron road – East Talpiyot - Mordot Arnona - Talpiyot	Minibuses are used on this route As of may 1 2026 the line is extend to Talpiyot industrial area
89	Extra	Kiryat HaMemshala – Kiryat Matersdorf – Sorotzkin St – Ohel Yehoshua St – Shamgar St – Malkhei Yisrael St – Yehezkel Street – Tzefanya Street – Bar Ilan Street – Ha’arazim central bus terminal	
90	Superbus	East Talpiyot – Kiryat HaMemshala (Knesset) – Jerusalem CBS – Givat Shaul Interchange – Herzog Medical Center	as of September 4, 2025 there will be schedule updates
91	Superbus	Herzog Medical Center – Giv'at SHaul – Beit HaKerem – Jerusalem Theatre – Chan Theater – East Talpiyot	
92	Superbus	(Circular route) . Gilo – Pat St. – Herzog St. – Gaza (Aza) St. – Ali’ash – Gaza (Aza) St. - Herzog St. - Pat St. - Gilo	On September 15, 2025, The line will not serve the Jaffa - Center/King George, HaDavidka Square/HaNevi'im and Ki'akh/Jaffa Light Rail Stations
95	Superbus	Hebron Road -Har Homa – Talpiyot – Katamon - Pat Intersection – Begin Expressway – Beit HaKerem – Yefe Nof light rail station - Yad Vashem	
97	Superbus	Ramat Rachel – Talpiyot – Keren Hayesod St. – Aza (Gaza) Rd. – Givat Ram – Kiryat HaMemshala (Knesset) – Jerusalem	significant line changes starting July 7, 2025 as of September 4, 2025 there will be schedule updates
111	Egged	(Holiday route) (Circular route). Malha Mall - Jerusalem CBS – Mahane Yehuda Market – Damascus Gate Western Wall– HaNevi'im St.- Mahane Yehuda Market – Jerusalem CBS – Malha Mall	Holiday Seasons and the Summer
136	Superbus	(Circular route) Mamila – Bar Lev – Ramot Junction – Ramot – Nabi Samuel – Ramot – Shmuel HaNavi st. – Bar Lev – Mamila	Minibuses are used on this route
150	Egged	(Circular route)Aminadav – Ora – Ora Junction Light Rail Station – Ora – Aminadav	Beginning February 1, 2026 The line will become a Circular route between aminadav and Ora junction
163	Superbus	Kiryat HaMemshala – Rachel's Tomb	Rachel's Tomb line. No dropoff/pick-up between intermediate stops.; Articulated buses are used on this route
222	Derech Egged	(Circular route). Givat Hamivtar Light Rail Station - Bar Lev – Damascus Gate – Western Wall – Jafa Gate – Bar Lev – Givat Hamivtar Light Rail Station	line is operated on holidays only
333	Superbus	(Circular route). Ramot Junction - Kiryat Sanz – Shmuel HaNavi St. – Western Wall – Shmuel HaNavi St. – Kiryat Sanz – Ramot Junction	As of December 5, 2025 the line will operate all days of the week Changing from a holiday and summer line to a full time service line; Articulated buses are used on this route
504	Superbus	(Circular route) Har Homa – Malha Mall – Begin Expressway – Jerusalem CBS – Kiryat HaMemshala – Begin Expressway – Malha Mall – Har Homa	Articulated buses are used on this route
505	Superbus	(Circular route) Har Homa – Gilo – Malha Mall - Begin Expressway – Beit HaKerem – Har Nof terminal – Beit HaKerem – Begin Expressway – Malha Mall - Gilo – Har Homa	
506	Superbus	Ramot Junction – Atirot Mada – Begin Expressway – Malha Mall - Gilo – Har Homa	As of December 5, 2025 the line will now operate on Fridays
508	Superbus	Giva't Massuah – Kiryat Menachem – Hantke St. – Bayit VeGan – Highway 50 – Atirot Mada	As of December 6, 2025 the line will now operate of Saturday nights
509	Superbus	Malha Mall – Pat Intersection – Herzog St – Emek Hamatzlevah - Jerusalem CBS –Begin Expressway – Atirot Mada	as of December 7, 2025 the line hours of operation will be extended from 20:10 to 00:10
510	Superbus	Mount Herzl - Kiryat Yovel - Ramat Denya - Pat Intersection – Katamon - East Talpiyot	As of December 5, 2025 the line will be operated as a 2 way line only and will no longer operate as a Circular route from 5:30-8:45
512	Superbus	(Circular route) East Talpiyot – Talpiyot – Malha Mall – Malha – Kiryat Menahem – Ora Junction – Kiryat Menahem – Malha – Malha Mall – Talpiyot – East Talpiyot	as of December 12, 2025 the line will no longer operate in a circular fashion
516	Superbus	Malha Mall – Malha – Bayit VeGan – Beit HaKerem – Begin Expressway – Ramot Junction – Ramot	This route is operated by Articulated buses
517	Superbus	Ora Junction – Kiryat Menahem – Malha – Givat Mordechai – Nayot – Aza (Gaza) Rd. – Bar Lev – Mount Scopus	as of August 26, 2025 the line will no longer enter Giva't Massuah and will instead terminate at Ora Junction As of September 4, 2025 light rail alternative station at Ammunition hill will remain a permanent stop
531	Superbus	(Circular route) Gilo – Malha Mall – Begin Expressway – Jerusalem CBS – Kiryat HaMemshala – Begin Expressway – Malha Mall – Gilo	Articulated buses are used on this route
540	Superbus	Malha Mall – Begin Expressway – Gesher Hameitarim – Begin Expressway – Route 1 – Pisgat Ze'ev	This route is operated by articulated buses
541	Extra	Kiryat HaMemshala – Jerusalem CBS – Begin Expressway – Ramot Junction – Begin Expressway – Beit Hanina – Pisgat Ze'ev – Atarot Industrial Zone	
567	Extra	(Circular route) Ramat Shlomo - Highway 50 - Givat Shaul - Highway 50 - Ramat Shlomo	
568	Extra	Mount Scopus - French Hill - Ramat Eshkol – Bar Ilan street - Yirmeyahu St. – Jerusalem CBS - Givat Ram	Rush Hour Express variant of line 68 bypassing Givat Hamivtar with service running in peak direction only; Articulated buses are used on this route.
569	Extra	Har Nof terminal - Givat Shaul - Highway 1 - Highway 60 - Central Command - Neve Yaakov	
580	Superbus	(Circular route). Ha’arazim central bus terminal – Ramot junction – Kiryat Tzanz – Bar Ilan street – Ha’arazim central bus terminal	Operates on weekends and holidays only.

== Suburban bus lines ==
The local public buses to the surrounding settlements are run by two operators, Derech Egged and Electra Afkim.

Line	Operator	Places	Notes
120	Electra Afikim	< Maale Adumim > Nofei Hasela - Megadim - Highway 1 - Highway 4177 - < Jerusalem > Mount Scopus - French Hill - Ramat Eshkol	weekday peak Direction service only
121	Electra Afikim	< Jerusalem > Har Nof terminal - Givat Shaul - Kiryat HaMemshala – Begin Expressway – Ramot Junction – Begin Expressway - Highway 1 - < Maale Adumim > - Megadim - Tesma Hsadeh	weekday Peak direction only
122	Electra Afikim	< Jerusalem > Har Nof terminal - Givat Shaul - Kiryat HaMemshala – Begin Expressway – Ramot Junction – Begin Expressway - Highway 1 - < Maale Adumim > - Keley Shir - Nofei Hasela	weekday Peak direction only
123	Electra Afikim	< Jerusalem > Atirot Mada - Ramot Junction - Highway 1 - < Maale Adumim >- Keley Shir - Nofei Hasela	weekday Peak direction only
124	Electra Afikim	< Jerusalem > Talpiyot - Hebron Road - Bar Lev St - Highway 4177 - Highway 1 - < Maale Adumim > Megadim - Tesma Hsadeh	
125	Electra Afikim	< Jerusalem > Talpiyot - Hebron Road - Bar lev St - Highway 4177 - Highway 1 - < Maale Adumim > Keley Shir - Nofei Hasela	weekday peak Direction service only
126	Electra Afikim	< Ma'ale Adumim > Maale Adumim, Tesma Hsadeh - Megadim - Highway 1 - Highway 4177 - < Jerusalem > Mount Scopus - French Hill - Ramat Eshkol	only operates in the Ramat Eshkol direction Weekdays only
127	Electra Afikim	< Jerusalem > Ammunition hill light rail station – French Hill Junction - Highway 1 - < Ma'ale Adumim > - Nofei Hasela	One bus at 6:45AM only towards Ma'ale Adumim weekdays
129	Electra Afikim	< Jerusalem > Hadassah Medical Center (Ein Kerem) – Kolitz Rd - Malcha Mall - Ramot Junction - Hebrew University - Highway 4177 - Highway 1 -< Ma'ale Adumim > - Keley Shir - Nofei Hasela	Weekdays peak direction only
131	Derech Egged	< Jerusalem > Jerusalem CBS - Ramot - < Givat Ze'ev > Har Shmu’el intersection - Giv’on HaHadasha - Giv’at Ze’ev	from April 17 2026 the line will no longer enter har shmuel
132	Derech Egged	< Jerusalem > Jerusalem CBS - Ramot - < Givat Ze'ev > Har Shmu’el intersection - Giv’at Ze’ev	
133	Derech Egged	< Jerusalem > Herzog Hospital - Romema - Ramot - < Givat Ze'ev > Har Shmu’el intersection - Giv’at Ze’ev	line will be extended to herzog hospital April 17 2026
134	Derech Egged	< Jerusalem > Herzog hospital - Romema - Ramot - < Givat Ze'ev > Har Shmu’el intersection - Giv’at Ze’ev, Agan Haayalot	line will be extended to herzog hospital April 17 2026
135	Derech Egged	< Jerusalem > Jerusalem CBS - Ramot - < Givat Ze'ev > Har Shmu’el intersection - Neve Menahem - Giv’at Ze’ev - Agan Haayalot - Beit Horon	
137	Derech Egged	< Jerusalem > Atirot Mada - Ramot - < Givat Ze'ev > Har Shmu’el intersection - Giv’at Ze’ev, Agan Haayalot	from April 17 2026 the line will no longer enter har shmuel
138	Derech Egged	< Jerusalem > Ha’arazim central bus terminal - Ramot - < Givat Ze'ev > Har Shmu’el	
139	Derech Egged	< Jerusalem > Atirot Mada - Ramot - < Givat Ze’ev > Har Shmu’el intersection - Givat Ze'ev, Agan Haayalot	
151	Derech Egged	< Jerusalem > Jerusalem CBS - Givat Shaul Interchange - Highway 1 - < Mevaseret Zion > Motza Ilit - Mevaseret Zion, Harel Interchange - Neighborhood J	Minibuses are used on this route
152	Derech Egged	< Jerusalem > Mount Scopus - French Hill - Highway 1 - < Mevaseret Zion > Neighborhoods C and H, Harel Mall, Nofei HaHoresh	Weekdays peak Direction service only
153	Derech Egged	< Jerusalem > Hadassah Medical Center (Ein Kerem) – Highway 1 - < Mevaseret Zion > Harel Mall - Neighborhoods A, C and H - Reches Halilim	Weekdays peak Direction service only
154	Derech Egged	< Jerusalem > Jerusalem CBS - Givat Shaul Interchange - Highway 1 - < Mevaseret Zion > Neighborhoods C and H, Harel, Neighborhood A	
156	Derech Egged	< Jerusalem > Jerusalem CBS - Givat Shaul Interchange - Highway 1 - < Mevaseret Zion > Harel Mall, Reches Halilim - Neidhborhoods D, E and F.	
157	Derech Egged	< Jerusalem > Jerusalem CBS - Givat Shaul Interchange - Highway 1 - < Mevaseret Zion > Nofei HaHoresh	
158	Derech Egged	< Jerusalem > Jerusalem CBS - Givat Shaul Interchange - Highway 1 - < Mevaseret Zion > Maoz Zion - Nofei HaHoresh	
159	Derech Egged	< Jerusalem > Yefeh Nof light rail station - Har Nof terminal - Givat Shaul - Highway 1 - < Mevaseret Zion > Harel Interchange - Maoz Zion - Neighborhoods C and H	Weekdays peak Direction service only
160	Derech Egged	< Jerusalem > Talpiyot - Malcha - Givat Mordedchai Junction - < Mevaseret Zion > Harel Mall, Nofei HaHoresh	weekday peak direction only
164	Electra Afikim	< Jerusalem > Ammunition hill light rail station – Highway 4177 - Highway 1 – < Ma'ale Adumim > Hametsadim - Keley Shir - Masu’a	
165	Electra Afikim	< Jerusalem > Ammunition hill light rail station – Highway 4177 - Highway 1 – < Ma'ale Adumim > Hametsadim - Keley Shir - Masu’a	
166	Electra Afikim	< Jerusalem > Ammunition hill light rail station – Highway 4177 - Highway 1 – < Ma'ale Adumim > Megadim - Tsemah Hasadeh - Masu’a	
167	Electra Afikim	< Jerusalem > Ammunition hill light rail station – Highway 4177 - Highway 1 – < Ma'ale Adumim > Nofei Hasela - Masu’a	
168	Electra Afikim	< Jerusalem > Ammunition hill light rail station – Highway 4177 - Highway 1 – < Ma'ale Adumim > Nofei Hasela - Masu’a	
169	Electra Afikim	< Jerusalem > Ammunition hill light rail station – Highway 4177 - Highway 1 – < Ma'ale Adumim > Maale Adumin - Mishor Adumin	
174	Electra Afikim	< Jerusalem > Jerusalem CBS - Highway 1 - < Maale Adumim > Hametsadim - Keley Shir - Masu’a	
176	Electra Afikim	< Jerusalem > Jerusalem CBS - Highway 1 - < Maale Adumim > Megadim - Tsemah Hasadeh - Masu’a	
177	Electra Afikim	< Jerusalem > Jerusalem CBS - Highway 1 - < Maale Adumim > Nofei Hasela - Masu’a	
178	Electra Afikim	< Jerusalem > Jerusalem CBS - Highway 1 - < Maale Adumim > Nofei Hasela - Masu’a	Peak direction service only
215	Electra Afikim	< Jerusalem > Ammunition hill light rail station – Highway 4177 - Highway 1 – < Kfar Adumim > Nofei Prat – Alon	
216	Electra Afikim	< Jerusalem > Ammunition hill light rail station – Highway 4177 - Highway 1 – Mitzpe Yericho	
351	Derech Egged	< Jerusalem > Jerusalem CBS - Ramot - < Givat Ze'ev > Highway 436 - Ofer Camp	Weekdays peak direction service only
352	Derech Egged	< Givat Ze'ev > Givat Ze’ev - < Jerusalem > Malcha - Talpiyot	one trip towards Jerusalem weekdays only From April 17 2026 the line will only run towards Jerusalem one trip weekdays

== Intercity bus lines ==
The Intercity public buses are run by ten operators, Egged which operates the lines to the center, up north and to Elat, Superbus which operates line 859, Kavim which operates the lines to Betar and Modin, Metropoline which operates the lines to the Negev and Elad, Tnufa which operates the lines to surrounding settlements and to Beit Shemesh, Galeem which operates the lines to the south, Electra Afikim which operates the lines to the Gush and Binyamin regions, Derech Egged operates lines to Beni Brak and surrounding areas, Nateev Express which operates the lines to Safed, and Dan BaDarom which operates the lines to Ashdod

Line	Operator	Places	Notes
100	Tnufa	Gesher Hameitarim - Sdot Dan, Shafirim Park and Ride.	Direct. Weekdays only
102	Tnufa	Mount Scopus- Shilat Junction - Sdot Dan, Shafirim Park and Ride.	Direct. Weekdays only
109	Kavim	Binyanei HaUma ICC - Mevo Horon - Sha’alvim	
110	Kavim	Ramot - Modi'in Maccabim Reut	
112	Tnufa	Ministry Of Justice - Shilat Junction - Sdot Dan, Shafirim Park and Ride.	Direct. One trip a day per direction weekdays only
113	Kavim	Binyanei HaUma ICC - Modi'in Maccabim Reut	Operates weekdays peak direction only
114	Kavim	Binyanei HaUma ICC - Modi'in Maccabim Reut	Operates weekdays peak direction only
116	kavim	Binyanei HaUma ICC - Ramot - Modi'in Maccabim Reut	Operates weekdays peak direction only
117	kavim	Binyanei HaUma ICC - Modi'in Maccabim Reut	
118	Tnufa	Malha- Givat Shaul - Modi'in Maccabim Reut	Weekdays only
140	Electra Afikim	Gesher Hameitarim - Givat Shaul Interchange - Pisgat Ze’ev - Civil Administration - Beit El	
141	Electra Afikim	Gesher Hameitarim - Givat Shaul Interchange - Pisgat Ze’ev - Beit El	
142	Electra Afikim	Ammunition Hill – Pisgat Ze’ev - Geva Binyamin - Sha’ar Binyamin	
143	Electra Afikim	Ammunition Hill – Ramat Eshkol - Ammunition Hill – Pisgat Ze’ev - Kokhav Ya’akov	
145	Electra Afikim	Gesher Hameitarim - Givat Shaul Interchange - Ramot Junction - Pisgat Ze’ev - Kokhav Ya’akov	
148	Electra Afikim	Ammunition Hill – Pisgat Ze’ev - Psagot	
149	Electra Afikim	Pisgat Ze’ev - Almon	
180	Tnufa	Binyanei HaUma ICC - Givat Shaul Interchange - Arza - Motza Ilit - Beit Zayit	
183	Tnufa	Binyanei HaUma ICC - Givat Shaul Interchange - Ma’oz Tsiyon - Zuba - Giv’at Ye’arim - Eitanim - Ramat Razi’el - Ksalon	
185	Tnufa	Binyanei HaUma ICC - Givat Shaul Interchange - Abu Ghosh - Neve Ilan	
186	Tnufa	Binyanei HaUma ICC - Givat Shaul Interchange - Shoresh - Beit Me’ir	
187	Tnufa	Binyanei HaUma ICC - Givat Shaul Interchange - Kiryat Anavim - Har Adar	beginning may 1 2026 temporarily will not stop at Central Station and go to Binyanei HaUma ICC in place
188	Tnufa	Binyanei HaUma ICC - Givat Shaul Interchange - Ein Naqquba - Ein Rafa	
189	Tnufa	Ramot Junction - Romema - Givat Shaul Interchange - Kiryat Ye'arim	
192	Kavim	Binyanei HaUma ICC - Malha Mall - Beitar Illit - Tzur Hadssah	Express
194	kavim	Malha Mall - Ora Junction - Hadassah Ein Kerem Hospital - Nes Harim - Bar Giora - Tzur Hadssah - Mata	
195	Tnufa	Binyanei HaUma ICC - Givat Shaul Interchange - Abu Ghosh - Nataf	
221	Kavim	Ramot - Beitar Illit	Operated on weekends and holidays only
222	Kavim	Ramot Shlomo - Beitar Illit	Operated on weekends and holidays only
224	Kavim	Romema - Beitar Illit	Operated on weekends and holidays only
225	Kavim	Har nof - Bayit Vagan - Gilo - Beitar Illit	
226	Kavim	Ammunition Hill – Shmuel HaNavi St – Malha - Gilo - Beitar Illit	
237	Kavim	Givat Zeev - Ramot - Beitar Illit	
238	Kavim	Rachel's Tomb - Beitar Illit	
239	Kavim	Ammunition Hill – Bar Lev St - Hebron Road - Beitar Illit	
241	Kavim	Ramot - Beitar Illit	Operated on weekends and holidays only
242	Kavim	Ramot Shlomo - Beitar Illit	Operated on weekends and holidays only
244	Kavim	Romema - Beitar Illit	Operated on weekends and holidays only
245	Kavim	Har Nof - Bayit Vagan - Gilo - Beitar Illit	
246	Kavim	Ammunition Hill – Shmuel HaNavi St – Malha - Gilo - Beitar Illit	
277	Metropoline	Ha’arazim Bus Terminal - Romema - Ramot - Givat Ze'ev - El’ad	
279	Kavim	Neve Ya’akov - Beitar Illat	Operates on weekends and holidays only
289	Tnufa	Ramot Junction - Har Hotsvim - Ben Gurion Junction - Kiryat Ye'arim	
290	Kavim	Atirot Mada – Romema - Gesher Hameitarim - Beitar Illit	
290	Tnufa	Binyanei HaUma ICC - Ariel	Beginning January 9, 2026 changes to the route will be made within Ariel
291	Kavim	Atirot Mada – Romema - Gesher Hameitarim - Beitar Illit	
292	Kavim	Atirot Mada – Romema - Gesher Hameitarim - Beitar Illit	
293	Kavim	Atirot Mada – Romema - Gesher Hameitarim - Beitar Illit	
294	Kavim	Atirot Mada – Romema - Gesher Hameitarim - Beitar Illit	
295	Kavim	Har Nof - Bayit Vagan - Gilo - Beitar Illit	One trip in the weekday morning toward Jerusalem and one trip towards Betar Illit Saturday night
295	Tnufa	Ari’el - Elkana - Rosh Ha’Ayin - Modi'in Maccabim Reut - Mevo Horon - Binyanei HaUma ICC	One trip weekdays towards Jerusalem only Beginning January 9, 2026 changes to the route will be made within Ariel
296	Kavim	Atirot Mada – Romema - Gesher Hameitarim - Malha - Gilo - Beitar Illit	
297	Kavim	Beitar Illit - Tsur Hadasa - Hadassah Ein Kerem Hospital	One trip weekdays towards Jerusalem only
300	Kavim	Gesher Hameitarim - Ramot - Givat Zeev - Modi'n Illit	
304	Kavim	Har nof - Givat Zeev - Gesher Hameitarim - Modi'n Illit	
308	Kavim	Ammunition Hill – Ramot - Givat Zeev - Modi'n Illit	
310	Kavim	Gesher Hameitarim - Ramot - Givat Zeev - Modi'n Illit	
311	Kavim	Romema - Modi'n Illit	Operated on weekends and holidays only
312	Kavim	Bayit Vagan - Modi'n Illit	Operated on weekends and holidays only
314	Kavim	Har Nof - Givat Shaul - Modi'n Illit	Operated on weekends and holidays only
316	Kavim	Ramot - Modi'n Illit	Operated on weekends and holidays only
317	Kavim	Ramat Shlomo - Modi'n Illit	Operated on weekends and holidays only
318	Kavim	Ammunition Hill – Ramot - Givat Zeev - Modi'n Illit	Operated on weekends and holidays only
320	Kavim	Gesher Hameitarim - Ramot - Givat Zeev - Modi'n Illit	
321	Kavim	Romema - Modi'n Illit	Operated on weekends and holidays only
322	Kavim	Bayit Vagan - Modi'n Illit	Operated on weekends and holidays only
324	Kavim	Har Nof - Givat Shaul - Modi'n Illit	Operated on weekends and holidays only
326	Kavim	Ramot - Modi'n Illit	Operated on weekends and holidays only
327	Kavim	Ramat Shlomo - Modi'n Illit	Operated on weekends and holidays only
328	Kavim	Ammunition Hill – Ramot - Givat Zeev - Modi'n Illit	Operated on weekends and holidays only
330	Kavim	Gesher Hameitarim - Ramot - Givat Zeev - Modi'n Illit	
331	Kavim	Romema - Modi'n Illit	Operated on weekends and holidays only
332	Kavim	Bayit Vagan - Modi'n Illit	Operated on weekends and holidays only
334	Kavim	Har nof - Givat Shaul - Modi'n Illit	Operated on weekends and holidays only
336	Kavim	Ramot - Modi'n Illit	Operated on weekends and holidays only
337	Kavim	Ramat Shlomo - Modi'n Illit	Operated on weekends and holidays only
338	Kavim	Ammunition Hill – Ramot - Givat Zeev - Modi'n Illit	Operated on weekends and holidays only
340	Kavim	Gesher Hameitarim - Ramot - Givat Zeev - Modi'n Illit	
341	Kavim	Romema - Modi'n Illit	Operated on weekends and holidays only
342	Kavim	Bayit Vagan - Modi'n Illit	Operated on weekends and holidays only
344	Kavim	Har nof - Givat Shaul - Modi'n Illit	Operated on weekends and holidays only
345	Electra Afikim	Gesher Hameitarim - Givat Shaul Interchange - Ramot Junction - Pisgat Ze’ev - Kokhav Ya’akov	
346	Kavim	Ramot - Modi'n Illit	Operated on weekends and holidays only
347	Kavim	Ramat Shlomo - Modi'n Illit	Operated on weekends and holidays only
348	Kavim	Ammunition Hill – Ramot - Givat Zeev - Modi'n Illit	Operated on weekends and holidays only
357	Kavim	Ha’arazim Bus Terminal - Gesher Hameitarim - Ramla - Be'er Yaakov - Kfar Chabad	Operated on weekends and holidays only
360	Electra Afikim	Binyanei HaUma ICC - Malha - Efrat	
361	Electra Afikim	Binyanei HaUma ICC - Malha - Elazar - Alon Shvut - Rosh Tzurim - Gva’ot	
362	Electra Afikim	Binyanei HaUma ICC - Malha - Elazar - Alon Shvut - Rosh Tzurim - Bat Ayin - Kfar Ezion	
363	Electra Afikim	Binyanei HaUma ICC - Malha - Har Gillo	
364	Electra Afikim	Binyanei HaUma ICC - Malha - Neve Daniel - Elazar - Rimon - Pnei Kdem - Metzad	also operated as a Night Line on route path
365	Electra Afikim	Binyanei HaUma ICC - Malha - Neve Daniel - Elazar - Rimon - Migdal Oz - Kisan - Ma’ale Amos	also operated as a Night Line on regular route path
366	Electra Afikim	Binyanei HaUma ICC - Malha - Talpiyot - Kfar Eldad - Nokdim - Tekoa	
371	Electra Afikim	Talpiyot - Elazar - Alon Shvut - Bat Ayin - Kfar Ezion	Operates weekdays only
372	Electra Afikim	Talpiyot - Neve Daniel - Elazar - Migdal Oz - Alon Shvut - Rosh Tzurim - Kfar Ezion	
374	Electra Afikim	Malha - Talpiyot - Kfar Eldad - Nokdim	
376	Electra Afikim	Malha - Talpiyot - Nokdim	
377	Electra Afikim	Talpiyot - Efrat	
377	Metropoline	Har Nof - Gesher Hameitarim - Ramot - Givat Zeev - Shilat Junction - El’ad	
380	Electra Afikim	Jerusalem CBS – Gesher Hameitarim - Malcha - Highway 60 - Nofei Mamre - Ramat Mamra Giv’at Harsina - Kiryat Arba	route is operated by bulletproof buses
381	Electra Afikim	Jerusalem CBS – Gesher Hameitarim - Malcha - Highway 60 - Nofei Mamre - Ramat Mamra Giv’at Harsina - Kiryat Arba - Har Hebron	route is operated by bulletproof buses
382	Electra Afikim	Jerusalem CBS – Gesher Hameitarim - Malcha - Highway 60 - Karmei Zur - Nofei Mamre - Ramat Mamra Giv’at Harsina - Kiryat Arba	route is operated by bulletproof buses
383	Electra Afikim	Jerusalem CBS – Gesher Hameitarim - Malcha - Nofei Mamre - Kiryat Arba - Har Hebron	route is operated by bulletproof buses
384	Electra Afikim	Jerusalem CBS – Gesher Hameitarim - Malcha - Gilo - Highway 60 - Nofei Mamre - Ramat Mamra Giv’at Harsina - Kiryat Arba	peak direction service weekdays only route is operated by bulletproof buses
385	Kavim	Neve Ya’akov - Modi'n Illit	operates on weekends and holidays only
400	Derech Egged	Jerusalem CBS – Givat Shaul Interchange - Bnei Brak	
401	Derech Egged	Herzog Hospital – Romema - Bnei Brak	beginning may 1 2026 the line will start and end its route from Herzog Hospital and not enter central station
402	Egged	Ha’arazim Bus Terminal – Romema - Beni Brak	beginning may 1 2026 the line will start and end its route from Ha’arazim Bus Terminal and not enter central station
403	Egged	Jerusalem CBS – Ramla - Be'er Yaakov - Rishon LeZion	weekdays only
404	Derech Egged	Ha’arazim Bus Terminal - Ramot - Bnei Brak	
405	Egged	Will be cancelled for approximately a year	Direct beginning may 1 2026 the line will be temporarily suspended
406	Egged	Jerusalem CBS – Holon - Bat Yam - Holon, Egged Garage	Express
407	Egged	Ha’arazim Bus Terminal - Givat Shaul Interchange - Netanya	
408	Egged	Jerusalem CBS – Givat Shaul Interchange - Lod	Express
409	Egged	Gesher Hameitarim - Romema - Bnei Brak	
411	Egged	Malkha - Bayit Vagan - Gehser Hameitarim - Givat Shaul Interchange - Bnei Brak	
412	Egged	Neve Ya’akov - Bnei Brak	
413	Egged	Har Nof - Givat Shaul - Bnei Brak	Weekdays trips are evening only
416	Egged	Gesher Hameitarim - Givat Shaul Interchange - Bnei Brak	
421	Derech Egged	Ramat Shlomo - Ramot - Givat zeev - Bnei Brak	Operated on weekends and holidays only
422	Derech Egged	Ammunition Hill – Ramot - Givat Zeev - Bnei Brak	
423	Derech Egged	Ramot - Givat Zeev - Bnei Brak	Operated on weekends and holidays only
424	Egged	Ha’arazim Bus Terminal - Romema - Givat Shaul Interchange - Rehovot	one trip per direction on weekends and holidays only towards Rechovot and one trip everyday towards Jerusalem
425	Derech Egged	Jerusalem CBS – Ramot - Givat Zeev - Shilat Junction - El Al Junction - Or Yehuda - Ramat Gan	
426	Egged	Ha’arazim Bus Terminal - Gesher Hameitarim - Givat Shaul Interchange - Petah Tikva	
427	Derech Egged	Jerusalem CBS – Givat Shaul Interchange - Petah Tikva	
428	Derech Egged	Jerusalem CBS – Ramot - Givat Zeev - Bnei Brak - Tel Aviv	Operated on weekends and holidays only
429	Derech Egged	Jerusalem CBS – Ramot - Givat Zeev - Bnei Brak	Operated on weekends and holidays only
430	Egged	Kiryat HaMemshala - Gesher Hameitarim - Givat Shaul Interchange - Latrun	Weekdays only; Minibuses are used on this route
431	Egged	Jerusalem CBS – Rishon LeZion	Direct
433	Egged	Jerusalem CBS – Highway 424 - Ramla - Highway 44 - Rishon LeZion	
434	Egged	Jerusalem CBS – Givat Shaul Interchange - Highway 411 - Rehovot	
436	Egged	Jerusalem CBS – Highway 3 - Ashkelon	Express
437	Egged	Jerusalem CBS – Highway 3 - Kiryat Malakhi - Highway 3 - Ashkelon	
439	Egged	Jerusalem CBS – Givat Shaul Interchange - Rehovot	Express
440	Electra Afikim	Jerusalem CBS – Gesher Hameitarim - Malha - Rimon - Otniel - Shim’a - Highway 60 - Be’er Sheva	Bulletproof buses are used on this route.
441	Dan BaDarom	Ha’arazim Bus Treminal - Gesher Hameitarim - Givat Shaul Interchange - Yesodot - Beit Hilkiya - Gedera	1 per day per direction
444	Egged	Jerusalem CBS – Highway 1 - Ein Bokok - Highway 90 - Eilat	
445	Egged	Jerusalem CBS – Eilat	Direct. Sundays only.
446	Egged	Jerusalem CBS – Highway 3 - Kiryat Gat - Be’er Sheva	Operated weekends and holidays only
447	Egged	Jerusalem CBS – Ness Ziona - Yavne	Operated weekdays only
448	Dan BaDarom	Jerusalem CBS – Highway 3 - Highway 7 - Ashdod	
449	Egged	Jerusalem CBS – Highway 3 - Kiryat Gat	
450	Dan BaDarom	Atirot Mada – Romema - Givat Shaul Interchange - Ashdod	
451	Dan BaDarom	Atirot Mada – Romema - Givat Shaul Interchange - Ashdod	
456	Egged	Jerusalem CBS – Be’er Ya’akov	2 Am trips weekdays towards Be’er Ya’akov only
457	Metropoline	Ha’arazim Bus Treminal - Gesher Hameitarim - Givat Shaul Interchange - Dimona	Operates towards Jerusalem on Friday and towards Dimona on Saturday night
458	Metropoline	Ha’arazim Bus Terminal - Gesher Hameitarim - Givat Shaul Interchange - Yerucham - Dimona	
459	Dan BaDarom	Ha’arazim Bus Terminal - Givat Shaul Interchange - Ashdod	Operated on weekends and holidays only
460	Egged	Jerusalem CBS – Kiryat Gat	
461	Electra Afikim	Ammunition Hill – Pisgat Ze’ev - Shiloh - Shvut Rachel - Eli - Ariel	Bulletproof buses are used on this route; Night Line
462	Electra Afikim	Ammunition Hill – Pisgat Ze’ev - Eli - Ma’ale Levona - Ariel	Bulletproof buses are used on this route
464	Electra Afikim	Ammunition Hill – Pisgat Ze’ev - Highway 60 - Ariel	Bulletproof buses are used on this route
465	Electra Afikim	Gesher Hameitarim - Givat Shaul Interchange - Ramot - Givat Ze’ev - Shilat Junction - Highway 6 - Karnei Shomron - Immanuel - Kdumin	
466	Electra Afikim	Ammunition Hill – Pisgat Ze’ev - Highway 60 - Har Brakha - Kdumin	Bulletproof buses are used on this route
467	Electra Afikim	Ammunition Hill – Pisgat Ze’ev - Highway 60 - Rehelim - Kfar Tapuach - Itamar - Elon Moreh	Bulletproof buses are used on this route
468	Electra Afikim	Ammunition Hill – Pisgat Ze’ev - Ofra - Ateret - Halamish - Kiryat Sefer - Modi'in Maccabim Reut	Bulletproof buses are used on this route
469	Electra Afikim	Gesher Hameitarim - Givat Shaul Interchange - Ramot - Givat Ze’ev - Shilat Junction - Karnei Shomron - Immanuel - Kdumin	
470	Egged	Jerusalem CBS – Be’er Sheva	
471	Egged	Ramot - Givat Ze'ev - Shilat Junction - Tel Aviv Savidor Railway Station	weekdays peak directions service only
472	Electra Afikim	Gesher Hameitarim - Givat Shaul Interchange - Pisgat Ze’ev - Geva Binyamin	weekdays only
473	Electra Afikim	Sha’ar Binyamin - Geva Binyamin - Pisgat Ze’ev - Ammunition Hill	One way weekday morning rush hour service towards Jerusalem only
475	Electra Afikim	Gesher Hameitarim - Givat Shaul Interchange - Ramot - Givat Ze’ev - Shilat Junction - Karnei Shomron - Kdumin	1 trip per direction on weekends and holidays
477	Metropoline	Bayit Vagan - Kiryat Ye'arim - El’ad	Operated on weekends and holidays only
478	Egged	Ma’ale Adumim - French Hill - Ramat Shlomo Junction - Be’er Sheva	2 trips toward Be’er Sheva on Sundays only
479	Electra Afikim	Gesher Hameitarim - Givat Shaul Interchange - Ramot - Givat Ze’ev - Shilat Junction - Revava - Immanuel	During weekdays one trip towards Immanuel
480	Egged	Mamila (night line)- Jerusalem CBS – Tel Aviv Savidor Railway Station	Morning alternatives from Har Homa, East Talpiot, Gilo, Ramot and Ein Kerem. Night alternate from Mamila. As of may 17, 2026 the morning alternative from Neve Ya’akov will be permanently cancelled and replaced by line 482
481	Egged	Maale Adummim - French Hill- Tel Aviv Savidor Railway Station	weekday peak directions service only
482	Egged	Neve Ya’akov - Tel Aviv Savidor Railway Station	weekday peak directions service only As of may 17, 2026 line 482 will also run in tel Aviv direction
485	Derech Egged	Jerusalem CBS – Givat Shaul Interchange - Ben Gurion Airport	operated on Tuesday Night/Wednesday morning only
486	Egged	Jerusalem CBS – French Hill Junction - Highway 1 - Highway 90 - Masada - Ein Bokek - Neve ZoHar	
487	Egged	Jerusalem CBS – French Hill Junction - Highway 1 - Vered Jericho - Almog - Beit HaArava - Kalya - Avnat - Mitspe Shalem - Ein Gedi	One bus per day
489	Derech Egged	Binyanei HaUma ICC - Rosh Haayin	Direct
490	Egged	Talpiyot – Malha – Tel Aviv, Azrieli Center – Tel Aviv Savidor Railway Station	Direct. Beginning may 1 2026 the line will operate on Fridays
492	Galeem	Ha’arazim Bus Terminal - Gesher Hameitarim - Givat Shaul Interchange - Highway 3 - Sderot - Highway 232 - Highway 25 - Netivot	
494	Galeem	Ha’arazim Bus Terminal - Gesher Hameitarim - Givat Shaul Interchange - Highway 25 - Ofakim	
495	Galeem	Gesher Hameitarim - Givat Shaul Interchange - Highway 3 - Sderot - Highway 232 - Highway 2211 - Naveh - Bnei Netzarim	
496	Galeem	Ha’arazim Bus Terminal - Gesher Hameitarim - Givat Shaul Interchange - Netivot	
498	Galeem	Ha’arazim Bus Terminal - Gesher Hameitarim - Givat Shaul Interchange - Tifrah	Operated on weekends and holidays only
499	Galeem	Ha’arazim Bus Terminal - Gesher Hameitarim - Givat Shaul Interchange - Tifrah - Ofakim	
546	Egged	Ha’arazim Bus Terminal - Gesher Hameitarim - Givat Shaul Interchange - Aluma - Komemiyut	operated on weekends and holidays only
554	Egged	Har Nof Terminal - Givat Shaul - Yirmiyahu St - Kiryat Zanz - Kiryat Gat - Arad	selected trips in the evening service givat shual and har nof terminal in the evening most trips begin and start service on yirmiyahu st
555	Egged	Har Nof Terminal - Givat Shaul - Yirmiyahu St - Kiryat Zanz - Arad	selected trips in the evening service givat shual and har nof terminal in the evening most trips begin and start service on yirmiyahu st
556	Egged	Har Nof Terminal -Givat Shaul - Yirmiyahu St - Kiryat Zanz - Kiryat Gat	selected trips in the evening service givat shual and har nof terminal in the evening most trips begin and start service on yirmiyahu st
577	Metropoline	Ha’arazim Bus Terminal - Gesher Hameitarim - El’ad	
600	Tnufa	Binyanei HaUma ICC - Beit Shemesh, Ramat Beit Shemesh	
614	Tnufa	Binyanei HaUma ICC - Gesher Hameitarim – Givat Shaul Interchange - Beit Shemesh - Ramat Beit Shemesh	weekdays peak direction only
615	Tnufa	Binyanei HaUma ICC – Ben Gurion Junction - Beit Shemesh	beginning may 1 2026 temporarily will not stop at Central Station and go to Binyanei HaUma ICC in place
616	Tnufa	Atirot Mada – Givat Shaul Interchange - Beit Shemesh - Ramat Beit Shemesh	
617	Tunfa	Atirot Mada - Romema - Givat Shaul Interchange - Beit Shemesh - Ramat Beit Shemesh	
618	Tnufa	Atirot Mada - Romema - Givat Shaul Interchange - Beit Shemesh - Ramat Beit Shemesh	
619	Tnufa	Atirot Mada - Romema - Givat Shaul Interchange - Beit Shemesh - Ramat Beit Shemesh	
620	Tnufa	Binyanei HaUma ICC – Givat Shaul Interchange - Beit Shemesh	weekdays only beginning may 1 2026 temporarily will not stop at Central Station and go to Binyanei HaUma ICC in place
621	Tnufa	Mount Scopus - Ramat Shlomo Junction - Beit Shemesh	Operates weekdays peak direction only
626	Tnufa	Malha - Givat Mordedchai Intersection - Beit Shemesh - Ramat Beit Shemesh	
628	Tnufa	Ramat Shlomo - Beit Shemesh - Ramat Beit Shemesh	weekends and holidays only
629	Tunfa	Neve Ya’akov - French Hill Junction - Ramat Shlomo Junction - Beit Shemesh - Ramat Beit Shemesh	Operated on weekends and holidays only
630	Tunfa	Binyanei HaUma ICC - Givat Mordechai Intersection - Ein Kerem - Beit Shemesh - Ramat Beit Shemesh	
637	Tnufa	Atirot Mada – Givat Shaul Interchange - Beit Shemesh - Ramat Beit Shemesh	Operated on weekends and holidays only
638	Tnufa	Atirot Mada – Givat Shaul Interchange - Beit Shemesh - Ramat Beit Shemesh	Operated on weekends and holidays only
639	Tunfa	Atirot Mada – Givat Shaul Interchange - Beit Shemesh - Ramat Beit Shemesh	Operated on weekends and holidays only
859	Superbus	Ha’arazim Bus Terminal - Givat Zeev - Shilat Junction - Afula - Tiberias	1 trip a day per direction weekdays only
912	Egged	Jerusalem CBS – Highway 77 - Tiberias	
930	Egged	Jerusalem CBS – Netanya	Direct
940	Egged	Jerusalem CBS – Haifa	Direct beginning may 1 2026 the line will be temporarily suspended
942	Egged	Jerusalem CBS – Harish - Highway	
949	Electra Afikim	Ammunition Hill – Pisgat Ze’ev - Rimonim - Kohav HaShar - Ma’ale Efraim	Bulletproof buses are used on this route.; also operated as a Night Line on regular route path
950	Egged	Jerusalem CBS – El Al Junction - Petah Tikva - Hod HaSharon - Highway 4 - Netanya	
952	Egged	Ha’arazim Bus Terminal - Gesher Hameitarim - Migdal HaEmek	
953	Egged	Jerusalem CBS – Highway 65 - Afula	
955	Egged	Jerusalem CBS – Highway 65 - Afula - Kfar Gid’on - Nazareth - Nof HaGalil	
956	Egged	Ha’arazim Bus Treminal - Givat Shaul Interchange - Nof HaGalil, Har Yona Gimel	Direct
959	Egged	Jerusalem CBS – Highway 65 - Afula - Highway 65 - Tiberias	
960	Egged	Jerusalem CBS – Yokneam Illit - Haifa	Direct
961	Egged	Jerusalem CBS – French Hill Junction - Highway 1 - Highway 90 - Beit She'an - Tiberias	
962	Egged	Jerusalem CBS – Highway 77 - Tiberias	
963	Egged	Jerusalem CBS – Highway 65 - Highway 90 - Kiryat Shmona	
964	Egged	Jerusalem CBS – Highway 65 - Highway 90 - Hatzor HaGlilit	operated on Sundays only in the Hatzor HaGolilit direction only
966	Egged	Jerusalem CBS – French Hill Junction - Highway 1 - Highway 90 - Sdei Trumot - Beit She'an - Highway 90 - Afikim - Ma’agan - HaOn - Ein Gev - Beni Yehuda - Ne’ot Golan - Highway 98 - Highway 808 - Katzrin	
967	Egged	Jerusalem CBS – French Hill Junction - Highway 1 - Highway 90 - Masu’a - Sdei Trumot - Beit She'an	
968	Egged	Jerusalem CBS – Misgav - Karmiel	
972	Egged	Ha’arazim Bus Terminal - Givat Shaul Interchange - Haifa	
976	Egged	Hafia - Givat Shaul Interchange - Gesher Hameitarim - Har Hotsvim	One trip on Friday in the Jerusalem direction only
982	Nateev express	Ha’arazim Bus Terminal - Gesher Hameitarim - Givat Shaul Interchange - Highway 443 - Shilat Junction - Ben Shemen Interchange - Highway 6 - Afula - Highway 65 - Amirim - Safed	
983	Nateev express	Ha’arazim Bus Terminal - Givat Shaul Interchange - Hatzor HaGlilit	Operated on weekends and holidays only
992	Nateev express	Ha’arazim Bus Terminal - Gesher Hameitarim - Givat Shaul Interchange - Amirim - Safed	
993	Nateev express	Ha’arazim Bus Terminal - Gesher Hameitarim - Givat Shaul Interchange - Highway 90 - Safed	
996	Egged	Ha’arazim Bus Terminal - Gesher Hameitarim - Givat Shaul Interchange - Rekhasim	
999	Egged	Ha’arazim Bus Terminal - Gesher Hameitarim - Givat Shaul Interchange - Rekhasim - Kiryat Ata	

== Night Lines ==
The night lines operate from 12:00-4:00 on Thursdays, Saturdays, holidays secular and Jewish, and during the summer

The lines are operated by Egged, Electra Afikim, Derech Egged, Kavim and Tnufa

Line	Operator	Places	Notes
102	Egged	Gilo – Talpiot – City Center – Jerusalem CBS	Night line On September 18, 2025, The line will not serve Keren HaYesod and King George Streets, or the Jaffa-Center Station
103	Egged	Neve Yaakov – Pisgat Ze'ev – City Center – Talpiot	Night line. Articulated buses are used on this route On September 18, 2025, the line will operate via HaDavidka Square and Aliash Street and Shmuel HaNagid Street, and will not serve the Jaffa - Center and King George/ Ben Yehuda Stations
104	Derech Egged	< Jerusalem > Mamila - Jerusalem CBS - Yeffe Nof light rail station - Givat Shaul - Highway 1 - < Mevaseret Zion > Emek Haarazim - Neighborhood I, C - Rekhes Khalilim - Neighborhood H, F, E, D - Ma’oz Tsiyon - Neighborhood J	Night line As of September 1, 2025 the line has returned to winter service ( no weekday service)
105	Derech Egged	< Jerusalem > Talpiyot - Hebron Road - Chan Theater – King David St - Center of Town - Jerusalem CBS - Ramot - < Givat Ze'ev > Har Shmu’el - Giv'on HaHadasha - Neve Menahem - Givat Ze'ev	Night line; Selected trips bypass Giv'on HaHadasha; As of September 1, 2025 the line has returned to winter service ( no weekday service)
106	Egged	Masua – Kiryat Yovel – Talpiot – City Center – Jerusalem CBS	Night line. Articulated buses are used on this route On September 18, 2025, the line will operate via HaDavidka Square and Aliash Street and Shmuel HaNagid Street, and will not serve the Jaffa - Center and King George/ Ben Yehuda Stations
107	Egged	Har Homa – East Talpiot – City Center – Jerusalem CBS	Night line On September 18, 2025, the line will operate via HaDavidka Square and Aliash Street and Shmuel HaNagid Street, and will not serve the Jaffa - Center and King George/ Ben Yehuda Stations
108	Egged	Ramot – City Center – Talpiot	Night line On September 18, 2025, the line will operate via HaDavidka Square and Aliash Street and Shmuel HaNagid Street, and will not serve the Jaffa - Center and King George/ Ben Yehuda Stations
115	Tnufa	< Jerusalem > Mamilla - Binyanei HaUma ICC - Gesher Hameitarim - < Beit Shemesh > Beit Shemesh - Ramat Beit Shemesh	Night line As of September 1, 2025 the line has returned to winter service ( no weekday service)
202	Electra Afikim	< Jerusalem > Kiryat HaMemshala – Mahane Yehuda Market – HaNeviim St. – Bar Lev St. – Highway 4177 - Highway 1 – < Kfar Adumim > Nofei Prat – Alon – Mitzpe Yericho	Night line
209	Electra Afikim	< Jerusalem > Kiryat HaMemshala – Center of Town - HaNeviim St. – Bar Lev St. – French Hill - Highway 4177 - Highway 1 – < Ma'ale Adumim > Ma'ale Adumim - Megadim - Tsemah Hasadeh - Keley Shir	Night line On September 18, 2025, the line will operate via HaDavidka Square and Aliash Street and Shmuel HaNagid Street, and will not serve the Jaffa - Center and King George/ Ben Yehuda Stations
211	Electra Afikim	< Jerusalem > Kiryat HaMemshala – Center of Town - HaNeviim St. – Bar Lev St. – French Hill - Highway 4177 - Highway 1 – < Ma'ale Adumim > Ma'ale Adumim - Nofei Hasela - Kedar	Night line On September 18, 2025, the line will operate via HaDavidka Square and Aliash Street and Shmuel HaNagid Street, and will not serve the Jaffa - Center and King George/ Ben Yehuda Stations
217	Kavim	Mamilla - Center Of Town - Binyanei HaUma ICC - Ramot - Givat Ze'ev - Modi'in Maccabim Reut	Night line As of September 1, 2025 the line has returned to winter service ( no weekday service)
260	Electra Afikim	< Jerusalem > Jerusalem CBS – Kiryat HaMemshala – Betzalel St – HaNeviim St – King George St -Keren Hayesod St – Hebron Rd - < Gush > Highway 60 - Karmei Zur - Nofei Mamre - Ramat Mamra Giv’at Harsina - Kiryat Arba - Har Hebron	Night line. Bulletproof buses are used on this route. On September 18, 2025, the line will operate via HaDavidka Square and Aliash Street and Shmuel HaNagid Street, and will not serve the Jaffa - Center and King George/ Ben Yehuda Stations
262	Electra Afikim	< Jerusalem > Jerusalem CBS – Kiryat HaMemshala – Betzalel St – HaNeviim St – King George St -Keren Hayesod St – Hebron Rd - < Gush > Highway 60 - Karmei Zur - Nofei Mamre - Ramat Mamra Giv’at Harsina - Al Baqa’a - Kiryat Arba	Night line. Bulletproof buses are used on this route. On September 18, 2025, the line will operate via HaDavidka Square and Aliash Street and Shmuel HaNagid Street, and will not serve the Jaffa - Center and King George/ Ben Yehuda Stations
264	Electra Afikim	< Jerusalem > Jerusalem CBS – Kiryat HaMemshala – Betzalel St – HaNeviim St – King George St -Keren Hayesod St – Hebron Rd - Gilo - Malha - < Gush > Har Gilo - Neve Daniel - Elazar - Migdal Oz - Alon Shvut - Rosh Tzurim - Bat Ayin - Kfar Ezion	Night line On September 18, 2025, the line will operate via HaDavidka Square and Aliash Street and Shmuel HaNagid Street, and will not serve the Jaffa - Center and King George/ Ben Yehuda Stations
265	Electra Afikim	< Jerusalem > Jerusalem CBS – Kiryat HaMemshala – Betzalel St – HaNeviim St – King George St -Keren Hayesod St – Hebron Rd - < Gush > Kfar Eldad - Nokdim - Tekoa	Night line On September 18, 2025, the line will operate via HaDavidka Square and Aliash Street and Shmuel HaNagid Street, and will not serve the Jaffa - Center and King George/ Ben Yehuda Stations
267	Electra Afikim	< Jerusalem > Binyanei HaUma ICC – Kiryat HaMemshala – Center Of Town - Golomb St - Dov Yosef St - Gilo - Ha-dagon - Givat Hatamar - < Gush > Zayit - Efrat - Rimon	Night line On September 18, 2025, the line will operate via HaDavidka Square and Aliash Street and Shmuel HaNagid Street, and will not serve the Jaffa - Center and King George/ Ben Yehuda Stations
269	Electra Afikim	< Jerusalem > Jerusalem CBS – Kiryat HaMemshala – Betzalel St – HaNeviim St – Bar Lev St - French Hill Junction - Pisgat Ze’ev - < Shomron > Geva Binyamin - Beit El	Night line As of September 1, 2025 the line has returned to winter service ( no weekday service)
270	Electra Afikim	< Jerusalem > Jerusalem CBS – Kiryat HaMemshala – Betzalel St – HaNeviim St – Bar Lev St - French Hill Junction - Pisgat Ze’ev - < Shomron > Kokhav Ya’akov - Psagot	Night line As of September 1, 2025 the line has returned to winter service ( no weekday service)
284	Kavim	Mamilla - Center Of Town - Binyanei HaUma ICC - Kiryat Hayovel - Hadassah Ein Kerem Hospital - Tzur Hadssah	Night line; One way only towards Tzur Hasassah; As of September 1, 2025 the line has returned to winter service ( no weekday service)
480	Egged	< Jerusalem > Mamilla - Center Of Town - Binyanei HaUma ICC - Har’el interchange - Hemed interchange - < Tel Aviv > Hamasger St - Tel Aviv Reading Terminal	The line is operated as a full-time route on a different route path at regular hours The line also operates every night

== Special lines ==
Theses lines are lines that run during special events only to better serve the needs of the event

Line	Operator	Places	notes
51א	Extra	(Circular route). Ha’arazim central bus terminal – Golda Meir - Shmuel HaNavi - Zachs Square - Ma’ale Ha-Zetim - Zachs Square - Shmuel HaNavi - Golda Meir - Ha’arazim central bus terminal	line is operated on select dates on selected Rabbis Yom
635	Jerusalem - Ramallah	(Circular route). Ha’arazim central bus terminal – Ramot – Tomb of Shmuel – Ramot – Ha’arazim central bus terminal	line is operated in coordination with Superbus on the Yom HaShanah at the Tomb of Shmuel
636	Superbus	(Circular route). Ha’arazim central bus terminal – Ramot – Tomb of Shmuel – Ramot – Ha’arazim central bus terminal	Line is operated during the Yom HaShanah at the Tomb of Shmuel
654	Extra	(Circular route). Ha’arazim central bus terminal – Ramot junction – Ezrat Torah - Romema - Central Station - Romema - Ezrat Torah - Ha’arazim central bus terminal	line is operated on Purim and other selected holidays
663	Superbus	(Circular route). Teddy Stadium - Tomb of Rachel - Teddy Stadium	Line is operated during the Yom HaShanah at the Tomb of Rachel
664	Extra	(Circular route).Teddy Stadium - Tomb of Rachel - Teddy Stadium	Line is operated during the Yom HaShanah at the Tomb of Rachel
666	electra Afikim	(Circular route). Ammunition Hill light rail station - Bar lev - western wall - Jafa gate - Bar lev - Mahal - ammunition Hill light rail station	line is operated during shukkot
668	Egged	(Circular route). Yirmiyahu St - Bar Ilan - Levi Eshkol - Ammunition Hill Light Rail Station - Shragay - Levi Eshkol - Bar Ilan - Yirmuyahu st - Gesher Hameitarim - Malcha	line is operated during Purim
669	Egged	(Circular route). Malcha -Gesher Hameitarim - Yirmiyahu St - Bar Ilan - Levi Eshkol - Ammunition Hill Light Rail Station - Shragay - Levi Eshkol - Bar Ilan - Yirmuyahu st - Gesher Hameitarim	line is operated during Purim
