= Prochorus =

Prochorus or Prochoros may refer to:

- Prochorus (deacon), one of the Seven Deacons of Acts
- Prochorus the Iberian (died 1066), Georgian monk
- Prochoros Kydones (14th century), Byzantine monk and theologian

== See also ==
- Prokhor
