= Monastery of the Cross =

Monastery in Jerusalem, Israel

- دير الصليب / Deir as-Salib
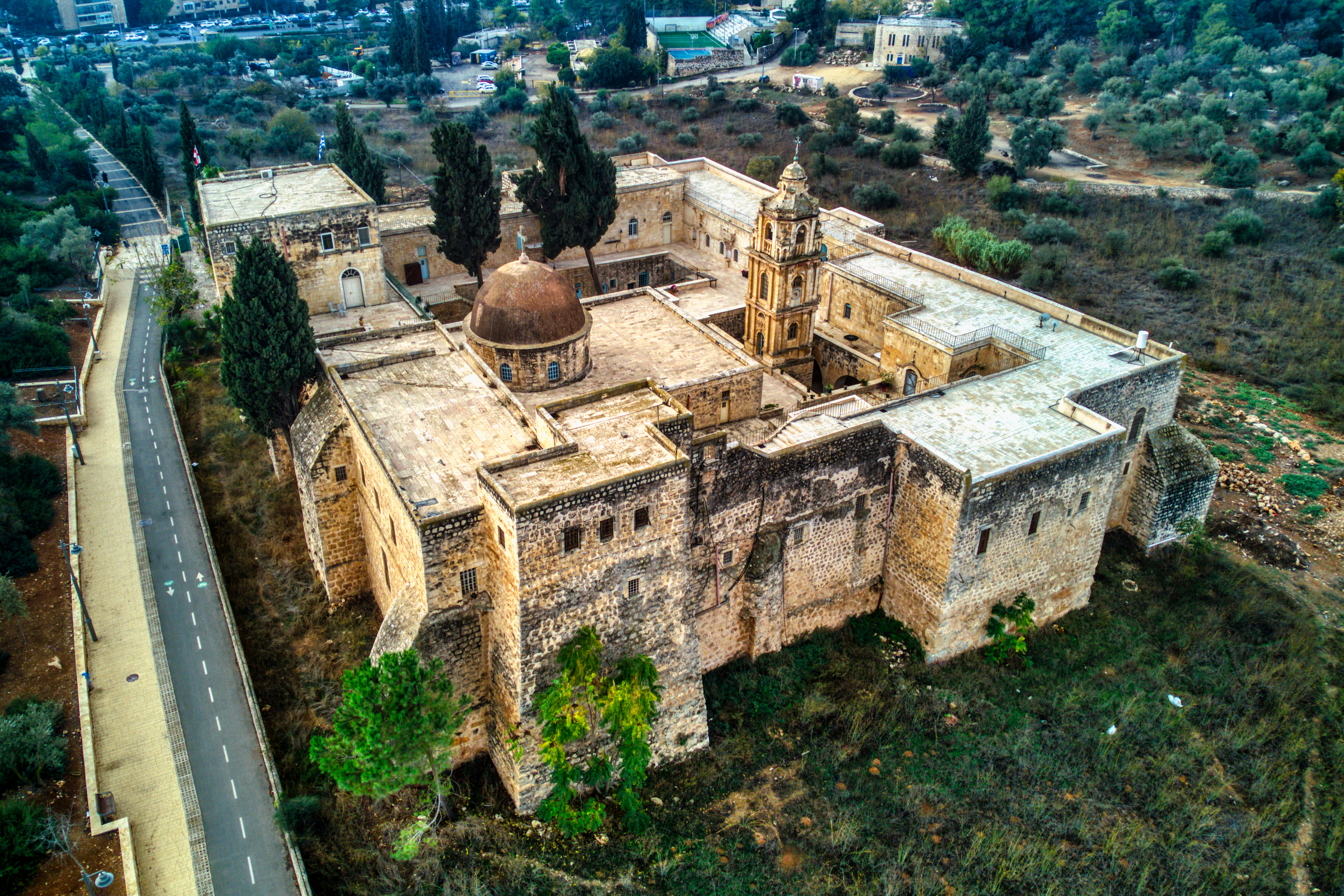

Religion
- Affiliation: Eastern Orthodox Church

Location
- Location: Jerusalem
- Interactive map of Monastery of the Cross
- Palestine grid: 1697/1309
- Coordinates: 31°46′19.56″N 35°12′28.8″E

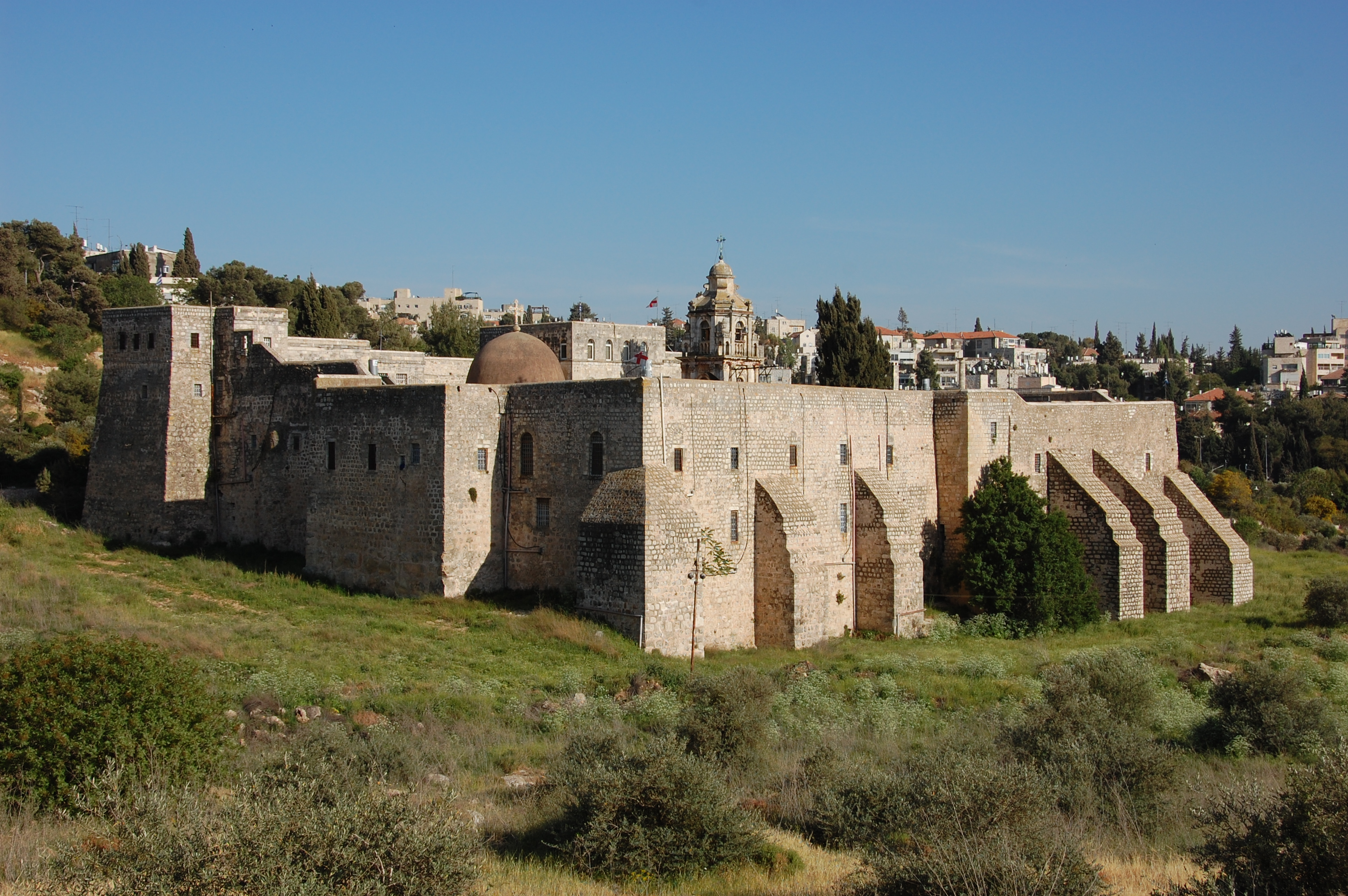
Exterior of the monastery

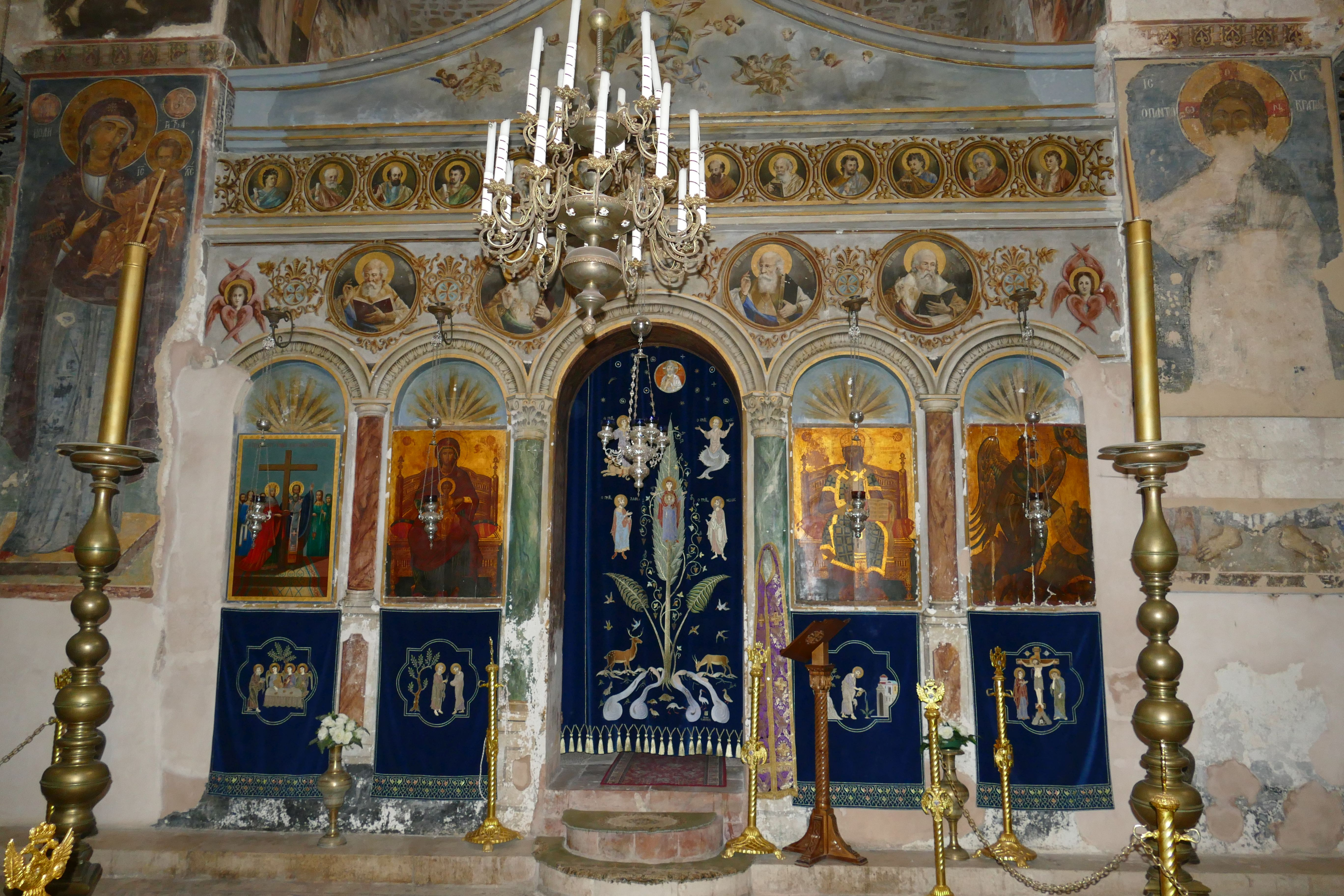
Interior of the monastery

The Monastery of the Cross (Arabic: دير الصليب, romanized: Dayr al-Salīb; Hebrew: מנזר המצלבה; Greek: Μοναστήρι του Σταυρού; Georgian: ჯვრის მონასტერი, jvris monast'eri) is an Eastern Orthodox monastery near the Nayot neighborhood of Jerusalem. It is located in the Valley of the Cross, below the Israel Museum and the Knesset.

== Tradition ==
Legend has it that the monastery was erected on the burial spot of Adam's head—though two other locations in Jerusalem also claim this honor—from which grew the tree that gave its wood to the cross on which Christ was crucified.

== History ==
=== Late Roman/Byzantine period ===
It is believed that the site was originally consecrated in the fourth century under the instruction of the Roman emperor Constantine the Great, who later gave the site to king Mirian III of Kartli after the conversion of his kingdom to Christianity in AD 327. Archaeologists have established that the first basilica was built at the end of the fourth century. As the founder of the church, scholars name Bakur, an Iberian prince, grandfather of the famous Peter of Iberia, who held the position of Dux Palestinae at that time. Remains from the fourth century are sparse, the most important of which is a fragment of a mosaic.

=== Early Muslim period ===
The monastery was built in the eleventh century, during the reign of King Bagrat IV by the Georgian monk Prochorus the Iberian.

=== Crusader period ===
The remains of the Crusader-period monastery form a small part of the current complex, most of which has undergone restoration and reconstruction. The Crusader section houses a church, including a grotto with a window in the floor that allows visitors to see the spot where, reputedly, the tree from which the cross was made once grew.

=== Mamluk period ===
Under Sultan Baybars (1260–77) the monks were executed after being accused of being spies for the Ilkhanate Mongols, who had recently destroyed Baghdad. In 1305, an ambassador of the King of Georgia, supported by Andronikos II, to Sultan Al-Nasir Muhammad achieved repossession of the monastery.

In the early 1480s Felix Fabri described it: "...we came to fair church, adjoining which is a small monastery, wherein dwell Georgian monks with their wives. When we entered into the church, we were led up to the high altar, which is said to stand on the very spot where grew the tree of the holy cross."

=== Ottoman period ===
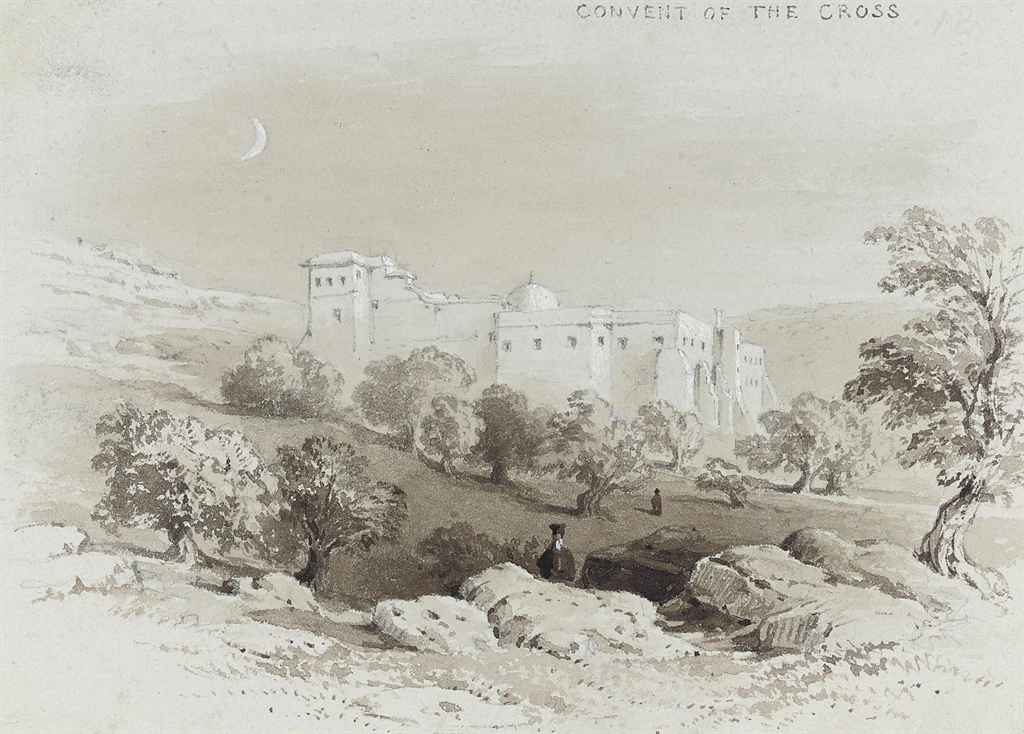
The monastery before 1853, when the bell tower was added

In the early 1600s, Franciscus Quaresmius described it as: "beautiful and spacious, paved with mosaic work and embellished with various Greek pictures. Moreover, the monastery is now indeed large, fortified and commodious; but formerly it was much larger, as its ruins demonstrate."

Due to heavy debt, the Georgians sold the monastery to the Greek Orthodox Patriarch Dositheos II in 1685. It is currently occupied by monks of the Greek Orthodox Patriarchate of Jerusalem.

In 1697 Henry Maundrell noted: "a Convent of the Greeks, taking its name from the holy Cross. This convent is very neat in its structure, and in its situation delightful. But that which most deserves to be noted in it, is the reason for its name, and foundation. It is because here is the Earth, that nourished the Root, that bore the Tree, that yielded the Timber that made the Cross. Under the high Altar you are shown a hole in the ground where the stump of the Tree stood, [..] After our return, we were invited into the Convent, to have our feet washed. A ceremony performed to each Pilgrim by the Father Guardian himself. The whole society stands round singing some Latin Hymns, and when he has done, every Fryar comes in order, and kisses the feet of the Pilgrim: all this was performed with great order, and solemnity."

=== Modern period ===
==== Georgian inscriptions painted over ====
In the 1970s and 1980s, the Georgian inscriptions were painted over and replaced by Greek ones. In a 1901 photograph showing the mural of the Council of Archangels, Georgian inscriptions are visible, but 1960 photographs show that the inscriptions had been changed to Greek; after cleaning the paintings the Georgian inscriptions emerged again. The same happened in the case of the Christ Anapeson, the "reclining Jesus".

==== Rustaveli portrait: defaced and restored ====
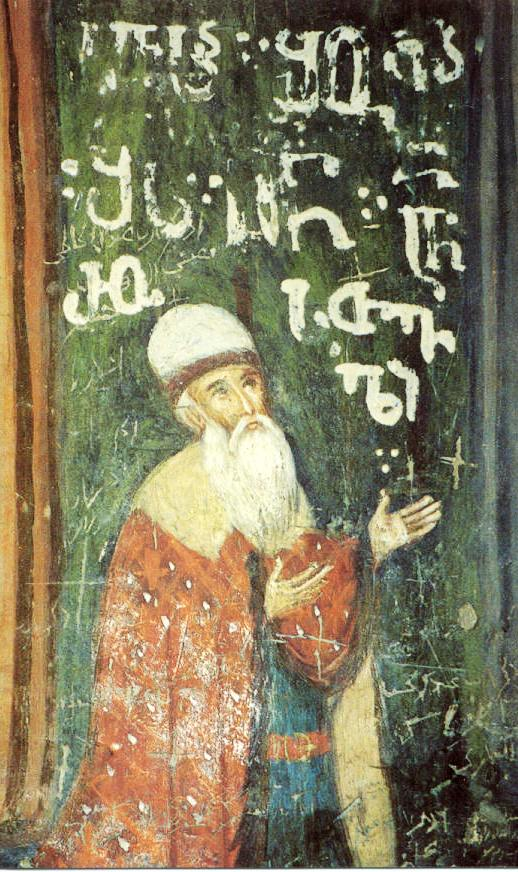
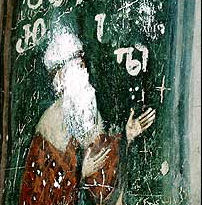
Fresco of Rustaveli before and after being vandalized in 2004

In June 2004, shortly before a visit by the Georgian President Mikhail Saakashvili to Israel, a fresco of the legendary Georgian poet Shota Rustaveli on a column inside the church was defaced by unknown individuals. It is the only extant medieval portrait of Rustaveli. The face and part of the accompanying inscription were scratched out. Georgia officially complained to Israel after the incident.

==== Vandalism ====
The monastery has been the target of repeated acts of vandalism. On February 7, 2012, suspected Jewish extremists spray painted graffiti calling for "death to Christians" in what is described as price tag attack. On December 12, 2012, the Jewish settler hate group defaced the monastery yet again along with desecration of an Armenian cemetery.

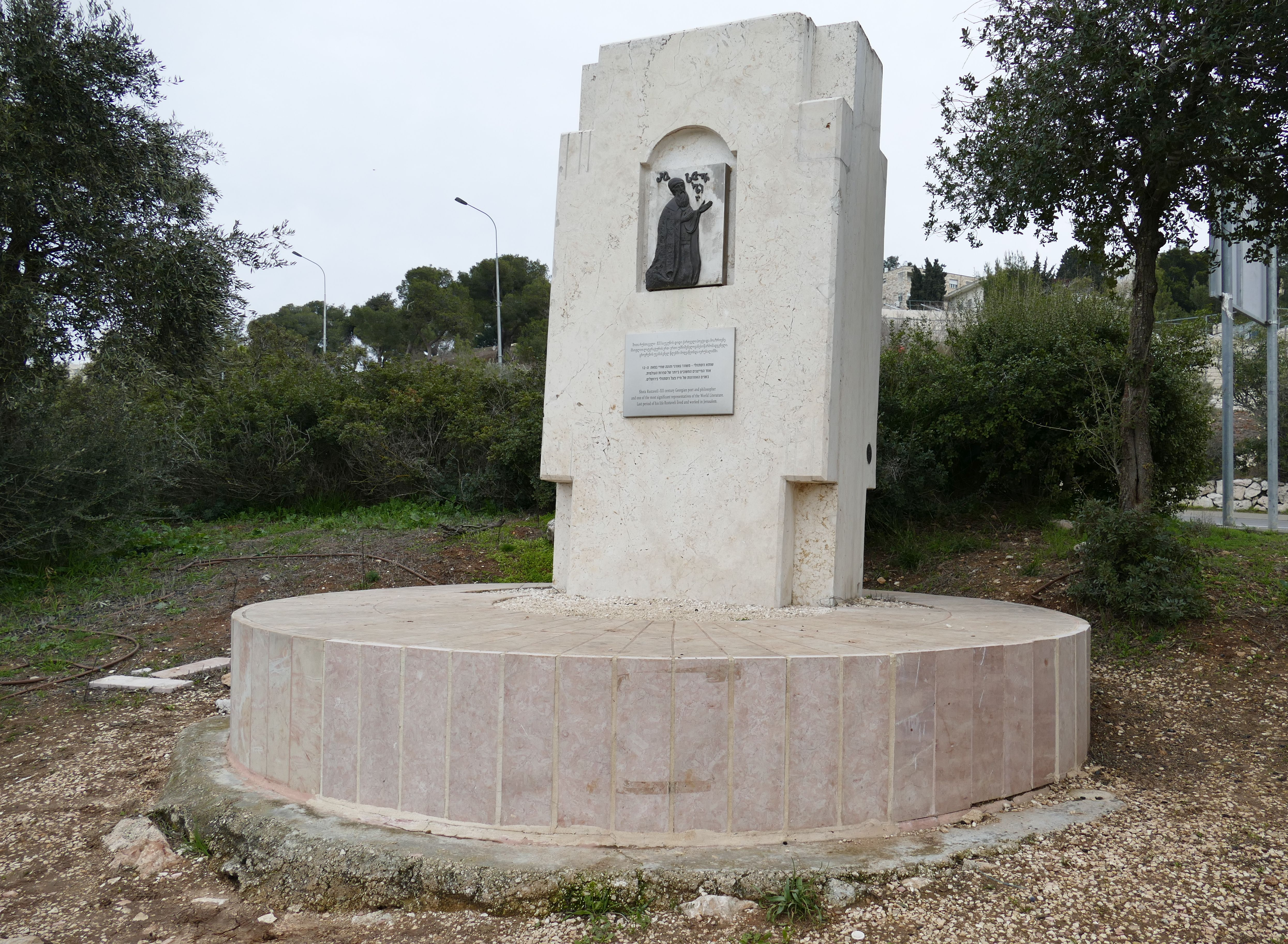
Memorial Monument for Shota Rustaveli near the Monastery of the Cross in Jerusalem (2020)

== Description, visit ==
The fortified monastery comprises a church and living quarters. The church contains ancient murals and inside a side chapel one can see a hole in the ground where, according to tradition, the tree once grew from which the Holy Cross was fashioned.

The library houses many Georgian manuscripts.

Visitors can also access a museum and gift shop.

== See also ==
- Nikoloz Cholokashvili (1585–1658), Georgian Orthodox priest, politician and diplomat. Archimandrite of the monastery between 1645-49.
- Religious significance of Jerusalem

== Bibliography ==
- Clermont-Ganneau, C.S. (1899). [ARP] Archaeological Researches in Palestine 1873-1874, translated from the French by J. McFarlane. Vol. 1. London: Palestine Exploration Fund. (p. 330)
- Fabri, F. (1893). Felix Fabri (circa 1480–1483 A.D.) vol II, part I. Palestine Pilgrims' Text Society.
- Guérin, V. (1868). Description Géographique Historique et Archéologique de la Palestine (in French). Vol. 1: Judee, pt. 1. Paris: L'Imprimerie Nationale. (pp. 77-82)
- Maundrell, H. (1703). A Journey from Aleppo to Jerusalem: At Easter, A. D. 1697. Oxford: Printed at the Theatre.
- Moudjir ed-dyn (1876). Sauvaire (ed.). Histoire de Jérusalem et d'Hébron depuis Abraham jusqu'à la fin du XVe siècle de J.-C. : fragments de la Chronique de Moudjir-ed-dyn.
- Palmer, E. H. (1881). The Survey of Western Palestine: Arabic and English Name Lists Collected During the Survey by Lieutenants Conder and Kitchener, R. E. Transliterated and Explained by E.H. Palmer. Committee of the Palestine Exploration Fund.
- Pococke, R. (1745). A description of the East, and some other countries. Vol. 2. London: Printed for the author, by W. Bowyer. (p. 47)
- Pringle, D. (1998). The Churches of the Crusader Kingdom of Jerusalem: L-Z (exluding Tyre). Vol. II. Cambridge University Press. ISBN 0-521-39037-0. (pp. 33- 40)
- Quaresmius, F. (1639). Historica theologica et moralis Terrae Sanctae elucidatio in qua pleraque ad veterem & praesentem eiusdem terrae statum spectantia accuratè explicantur, varij errores refelluntur, veritas fideliter exacteque discutitur ac comprobatur. ... Auctore Fr. Francisco Quaresmio Laudensi, ordinis Minorum theologo, ... Tomus 1. Vol. 2.
- Robinson, E.; Smith, E. (1841). Biblical Researches in Palestine, Mount Sinai and Arabia Petraea: A Journal of Travels in the year 1838. Vol. 2. Boston: Crocker & Brewster. (pp. 90, 323)
- Robinson, E.; Smith, E. (1841). Biblical Researches in Palestine, Mount Sinai and Arabia Petraea: A Journal of Travels in the year 1838. Vol. 3. Boston: Crocker & Brewster. (p. 123)
- Vogüé, de, M. (1860). Les églises de la Terre Sainte.(p. 340)
- Warren, C.; Conder, C.R. (1884). The Survey of Western Palestine: Jerusalem. London: Committee of the Palestine Exploration Fund. (p. 379)
