= Prochorus the Iberian =

Georgian saint

Saint Prochorus the Iberian
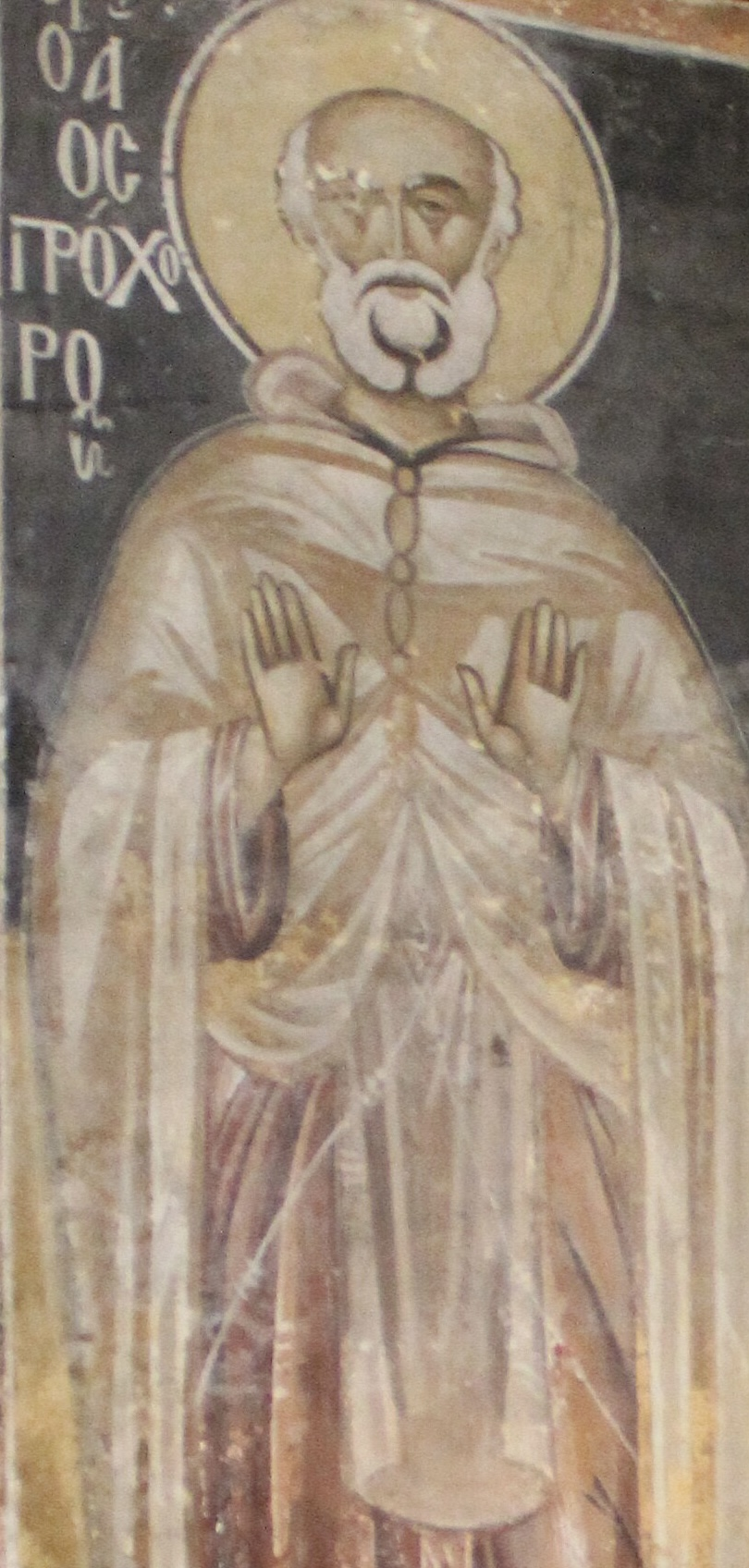
- An original fresco of Prochorus from Monastery of the Cross. It was cut out of the wall and moved to Svetitskhoveli Cathedral now kept as an icon.

Jerusalemite Father
- Born: c. 985; Kingdom of the Iberians
- Died: c. 1066; Wadi Mujib (present-day Jordan)
- Venerated in: Eastern Orthodox Church
- Major shrine: Monastery of the Cross
- Feast: February 12
- Patronage: Georgia; Monastery of the Cross

Prochorus the Iberian (Georgian: პროხორე ქართველი, romanized: p'rokhore kartveli) (c. 985–1066) was a Georgian monk and founder of the Monastery of the Cross in Jerusalem.

== Life ==
According to the Georgian Vita of Prochorus, he was born in the Kingdom of the Iberians under the name George of Shavsheti (Georgian: გიორგი შავშელი, romanized: giorgi shavsheli) and was raised in a local monastery, where he became a monk and later a priest. Around 1010–1015, at the age of 30, he left for the Holy Land to pursue a monastic life and spiritual study.

Prochorus spent approximately a decade at the Lavra of Saint Sabas, one of the most important monastic centers in the region, where he honed his ascetic practices and gained experience in monastic administration. Around the 1020s, he moved to Jerusalem to gather Georgian monks who were scattered across the Palestinian monasteries and to strengthen the presence of Georgian monasticism in the Holy Land.

Per the Vita, Prochorus constructed the Monastery of the Cross in 1064 by order of King Bagrat IV of Georgia, using donations transported to Jerusalem by George the Hagiorite. The monastery was located in the Valley of the Cross, a site traditionally linked to early Christian legends and even to a relic of the True Cross.

Prochorus not only rebuilt and expanded the monastery but also established rules and a monastic regimen modeled on the Lavra of Saint Sabas, organizing nearly eighty ascetic monks under his guidance. He constructed a church adorned with ornaments and icons, as well as a hostel for pilgrims, reflecting both spiritual and practical care for visitors.

During the 14th century, the monastery became a major Georgian monastic and cultural center in Jerusalem, hosting Georgian monks, scribes, and clergy. Over the centuries, it served as a hub for the preservation of Georgian liturgical traditions and manuscripts. By the late 17th century, due to financial difficulties, the monastery came under the jurisdiction of the Greek Orthodox Patriarchate, although Georgian influence remained culturally significant.

After completing his work in Jerusalem, Prochorus retired to the Arnon desert, where he spent his remaining years in solitude. He died there in 1066. He is venerated as a saint in the Eastern Orthodox Church, and his feast day is celebrated on February 12.

== Legacy ==
Prochorus the Iberian is remembered not only for founding and restoring the Monastery of the Cross but also for strengthening Georgian monasticism in the Holy Land. His writings, including a Menologium preserved at the Bodleian Library, provide insights into Georgian liturgical practices, calligraphy, and the transmission of Christian texts across cultural boundaries.

== See also ==
- Gabriel the Iberian

== Bibliography ==
- Charkiewicz, Jarosław (2005). Gruzińscy święci. Warszawa: Warszawska Metropolia Prawosławna. ISBN 8392009371.
- Salia, Kalistrat (1983). History of the Georgian Nation. Paris: Académie Française.
- Tchekhanovets, Yana (2018). The Caucasian Archaeology of the Holy Land: Armenian, Georgian and Albanian Communities Between the Fourth and Eleventh Centuries CE. Handbook of Oriental Studies. Section 1 The Near and Middle East, vol. 123. Brill. ISBN 9789004362246.
