= Ramat Eshkol =

Israeli settlement in the West Bank

Coordinates: 31°48′07″N 35°13′22″E

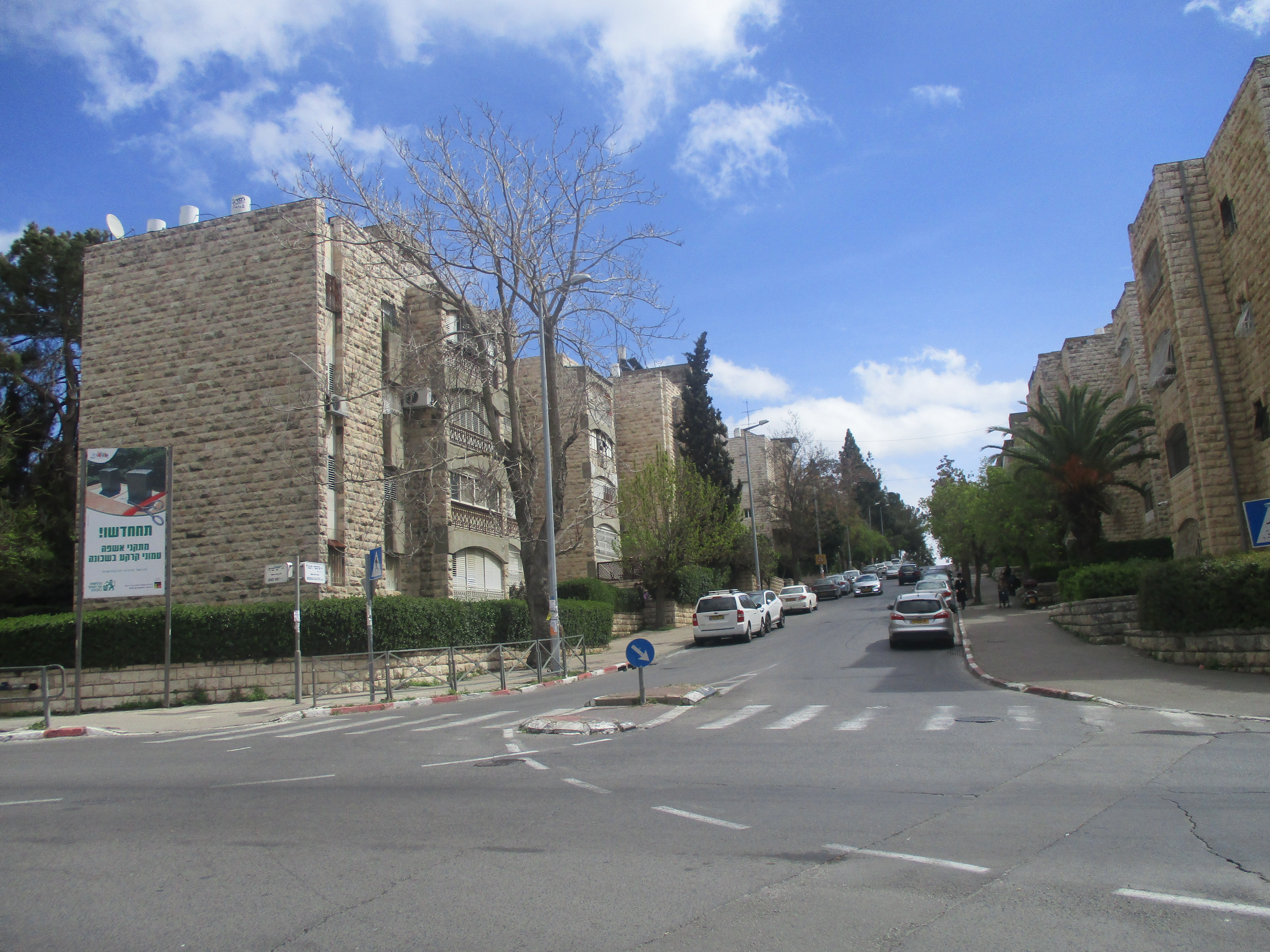
View of Ramat Eshkol apartment buildings

Ramat Eshkol (Hebrew: רמת אשכול;) (also Ramot Eshkol Hebrew: רמות אשכול) is an Israeli settlement and neighborhood in northern East Jerusalem. It was built on land captured from Jordan in the Six-Day War and occupied by Israel since 1967, and was the first settlement built in East Jerusalem beyond the Green Line by Israel. As of 2017, about 8,975 people live in the neighborhood.

== History ==
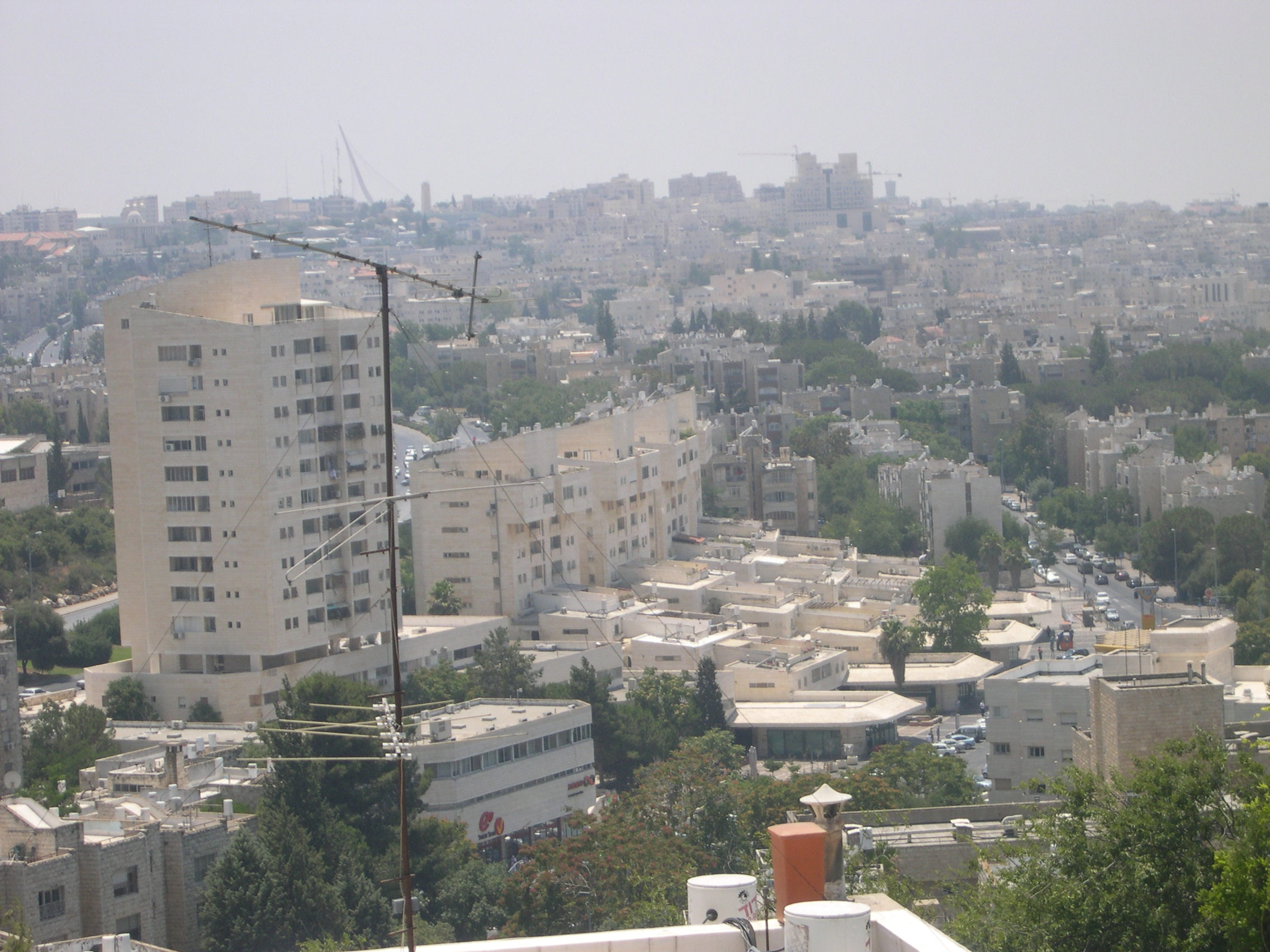
Paran Street in Ramat Eshkol

In 1966, the border with Jordan ran parallel to Shmuel HaNavi Street. Beyond was a no man's land and the bunkers and fortifications of Ammunition Hill, the site of fierce battles between Jordanian and Israeli forces in the 1967 war.

According to ARIJ, Israel confiscated 416 dunams of land from the Palestinian neighbourhood of Shuafat in order to construct Ramat Eshkol.

Ramat Eshkol (lit. "Eshkol Heights") was the first new neighborhood built in Jerusalem after the Six Day War, along the route to Mount Scopus, Hadassah Hospital and the Hebrew University.

Plans were drawn up for tree-lined streets, small parks, a neighborhood health clinic and a commercial center with a supermarket. Most of the new apartment buildings were limited to four floors. The architecture included prefab elements, but outside walls were faced with a veneer of Jerusalem stone. Ramat Eshkol was designed as a middle-class neighborhood.

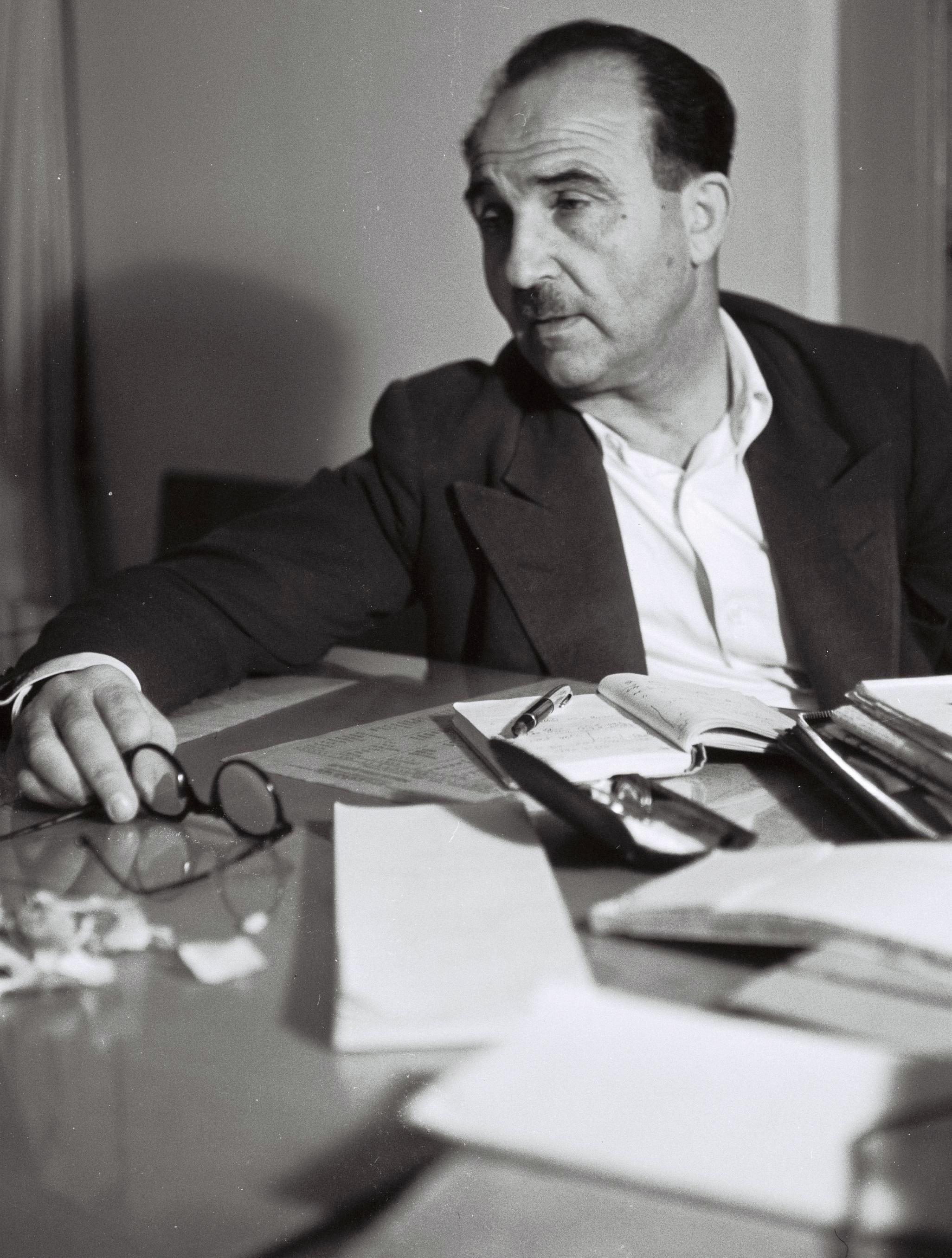
Levi Eshkol

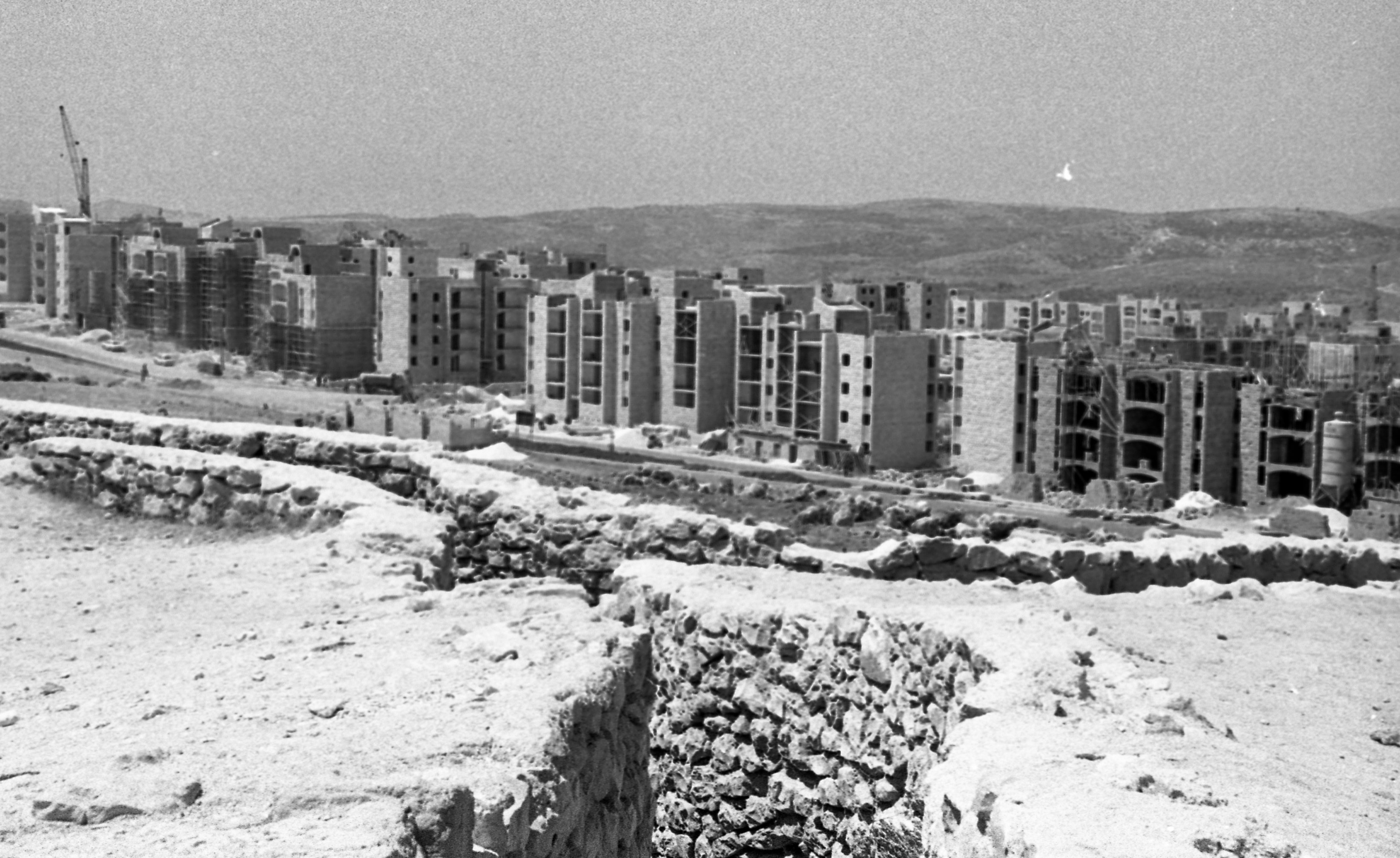
Construction in 1969 of the Israeli settlement of Ramat Eshkol, in East Jerusalem.

Construction on Sderot Eshkol (Eshkol Boulevard), named for Israeli prime minister Levi Eshkol, began in 1968

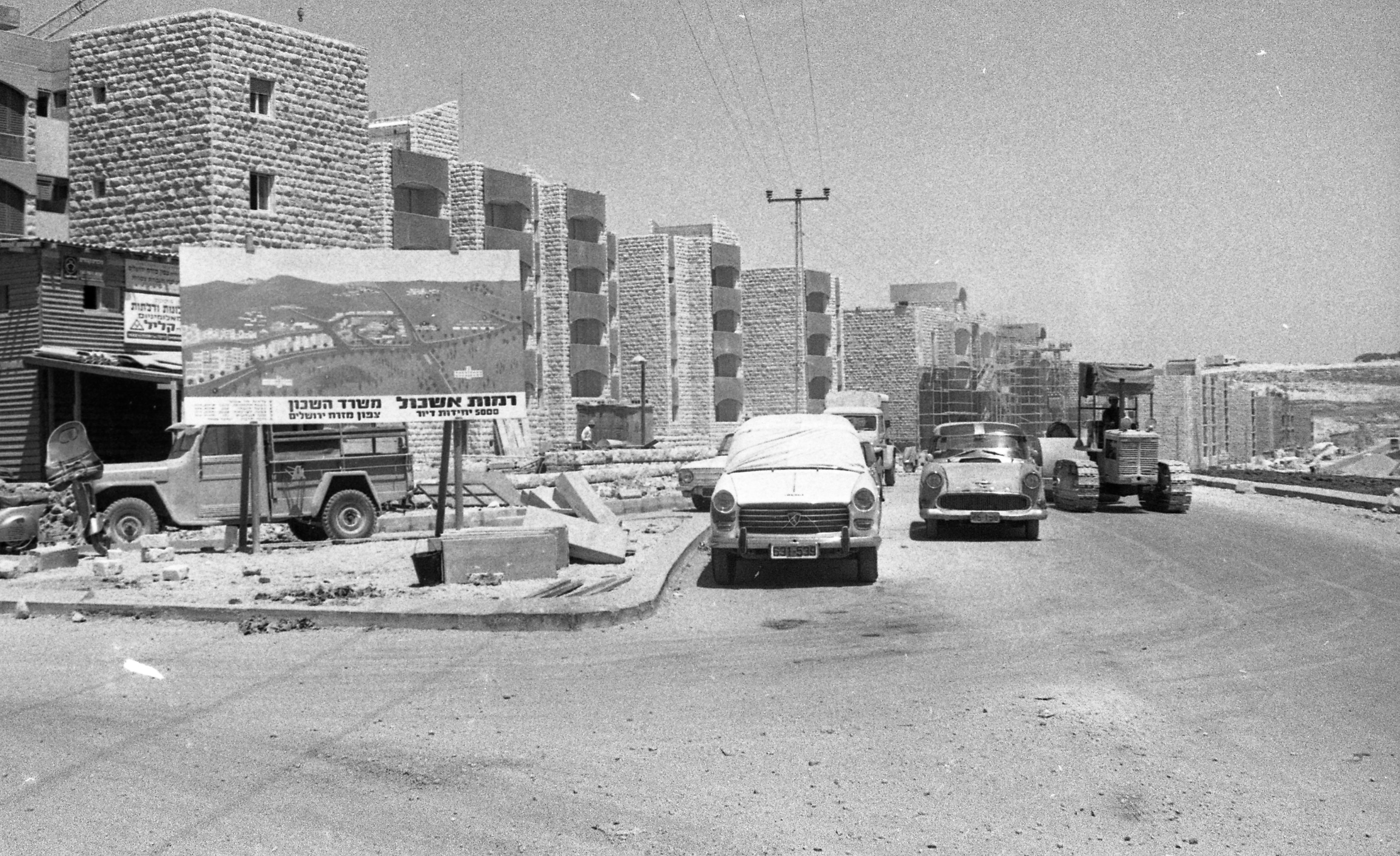
The neighborhood while it was being built in 1969

Israel Levitt of the Israel Defense Forces Engineering Corps cleared the mines on what is now Etzion Gaver street. Levitt, also a trained architect, designed the first buildings there. In January 1970, the first occupants moved in. There were no roads, and the nearest bus was on Shmuel Hanavi. The first minyan was held in an air raid shelter on Etzion Gaver street, before the completion of a synagogue.

Government policy at the time was to create a contiguous link from Shmuel Hanavi to French Hill and the campus of Hebrew University of Jerusalem on Mount Scopus. A new bus line, number 9, was inaugurated to link the Mount Scopus campus with the campus in Givat Ram, built when the road to Mount Scopus was blocked by the Jordanians. The route of the bus followed the route of the convoy attacked on April 13, 1948, killing doctors and nurses of Hadassah Hospital.

Building also began at this time in Givat HaMivtar. Plots were raffled off for the construction of single-family homes. A time limit was imposed on construction and access was difficult. The only access was via a muddy track. The construction of private homes on Ramat Hagolan Street in Ramat Eshkol also employed the lottery method.

== Parks and memorials ==
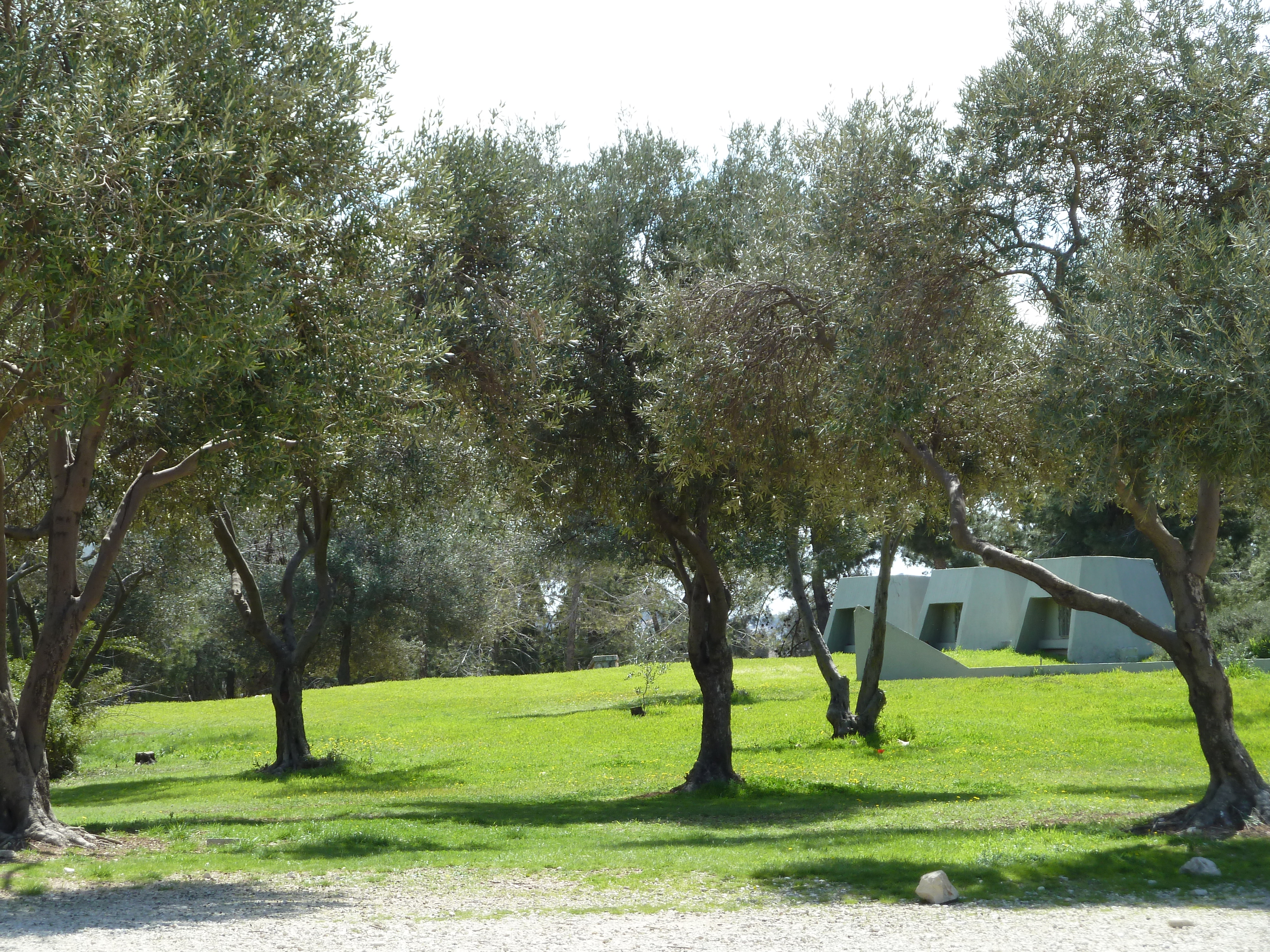
Ammunition Hill park

After the Six-Day War, Ammunition Hill was restored and turned into a park and memorial site. Ramat Eshkol also has a park dedicated to Raoul Wallenberg, the Swedish diplomat who saved many Jews during World War II. The neighborhood's largest park is Gan HaHamishah Asar (Park of the Fifteen) commemorating fifteen soldiers killed in 1969 in one day of fighting during the War of Attrition. It also has a park named Gan Eshkolot which is named after a tomb inside with two grape cluster designs on both sides of the tomb's entrance which are called in Hebrew eshkol.

== Archaeology ==
The Eshkolot Tomb in Ramat Eshkol was discovered in 1897. It was the burial site of a prosperous Jerusalem family in the 1st century, part of a large necropolis that surrounded Jerusalem in the Second Temple period. Eshkolot is the plural of eshkol, meaning "cluster of grapes"; the tomb is named for the stone carving of a cluster of grapes over the entrance. Three ossuaries with Hebrew and Aramaic inscriptions were also recovered from a rock-hewn single chamber cave on Ramat Hagolan Street in Ramat Eshkol.

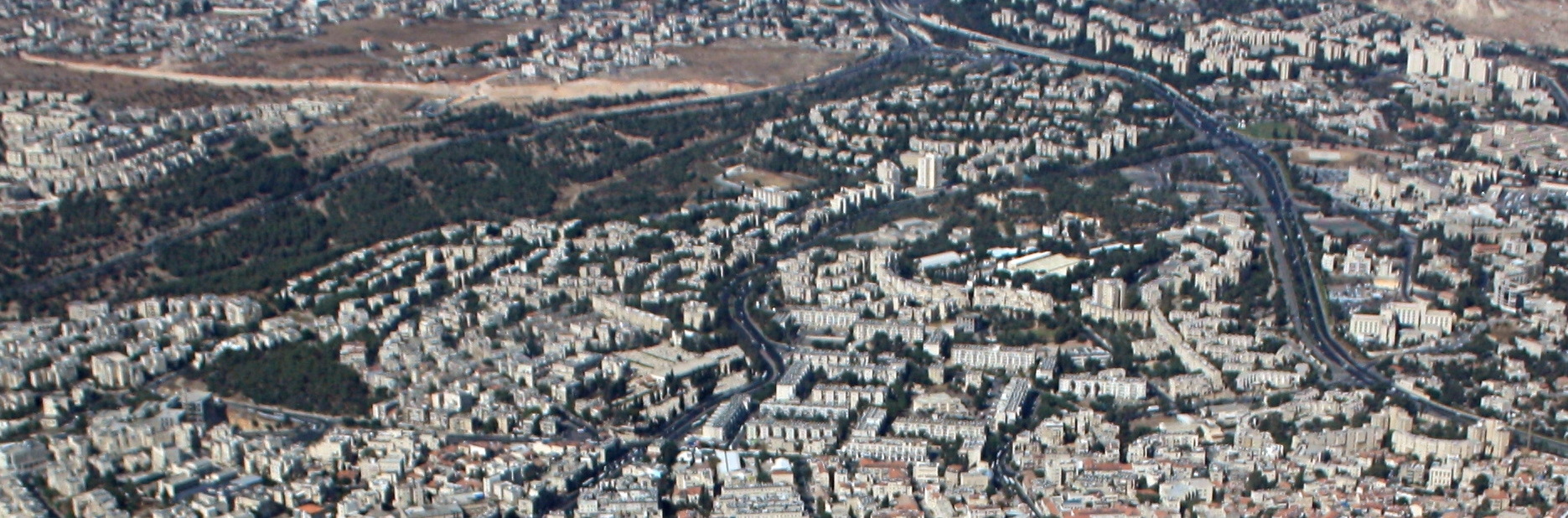
Aerial view of Shmuel Hanavi, Givat Hamivtar and Ramat Eshkol
