= Valley of the Cross =

Valley in Jerusalem

Coordinates: 31°46′23″N 35°12′27″E

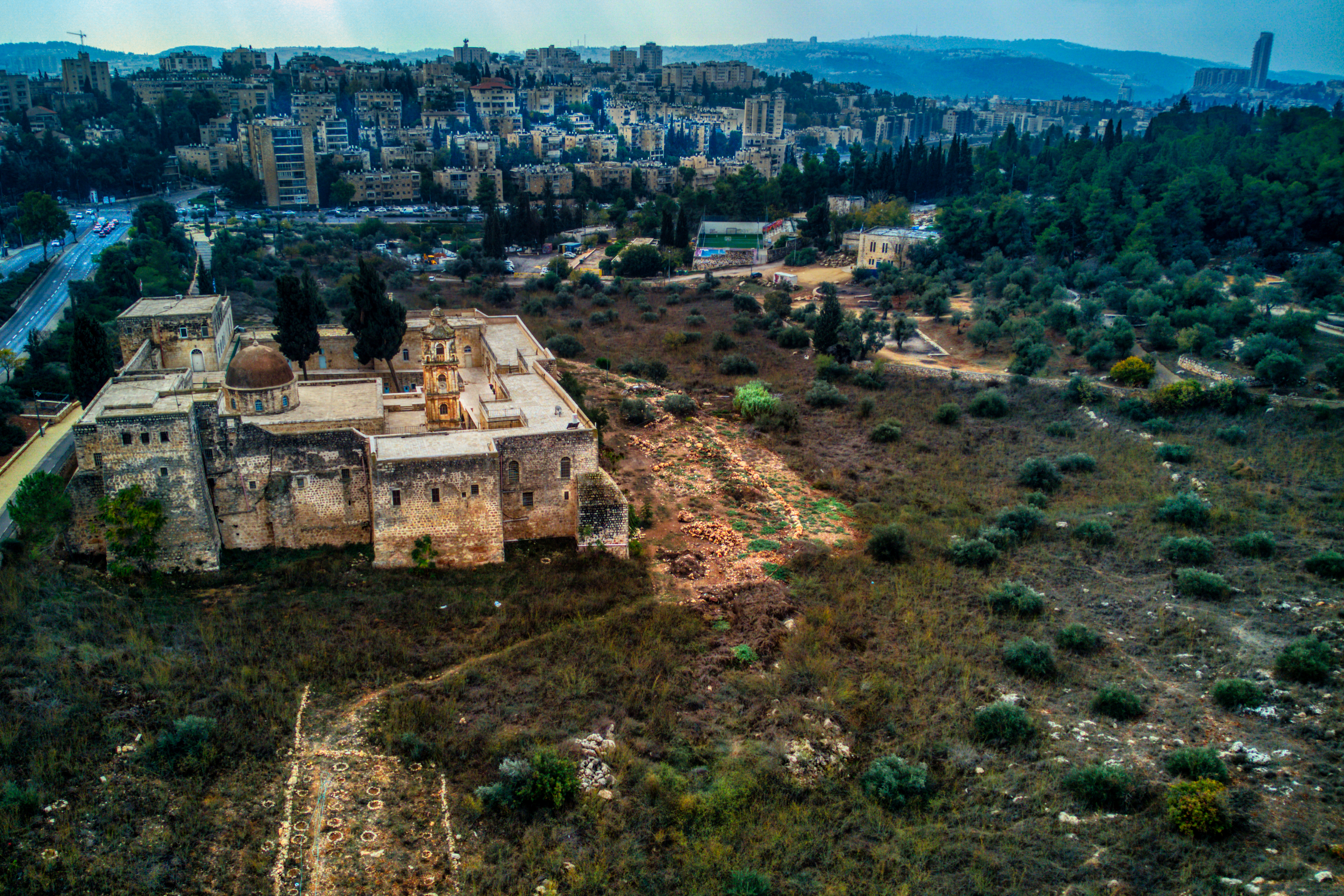
The valley of the Cross and the Monastery of the Cross

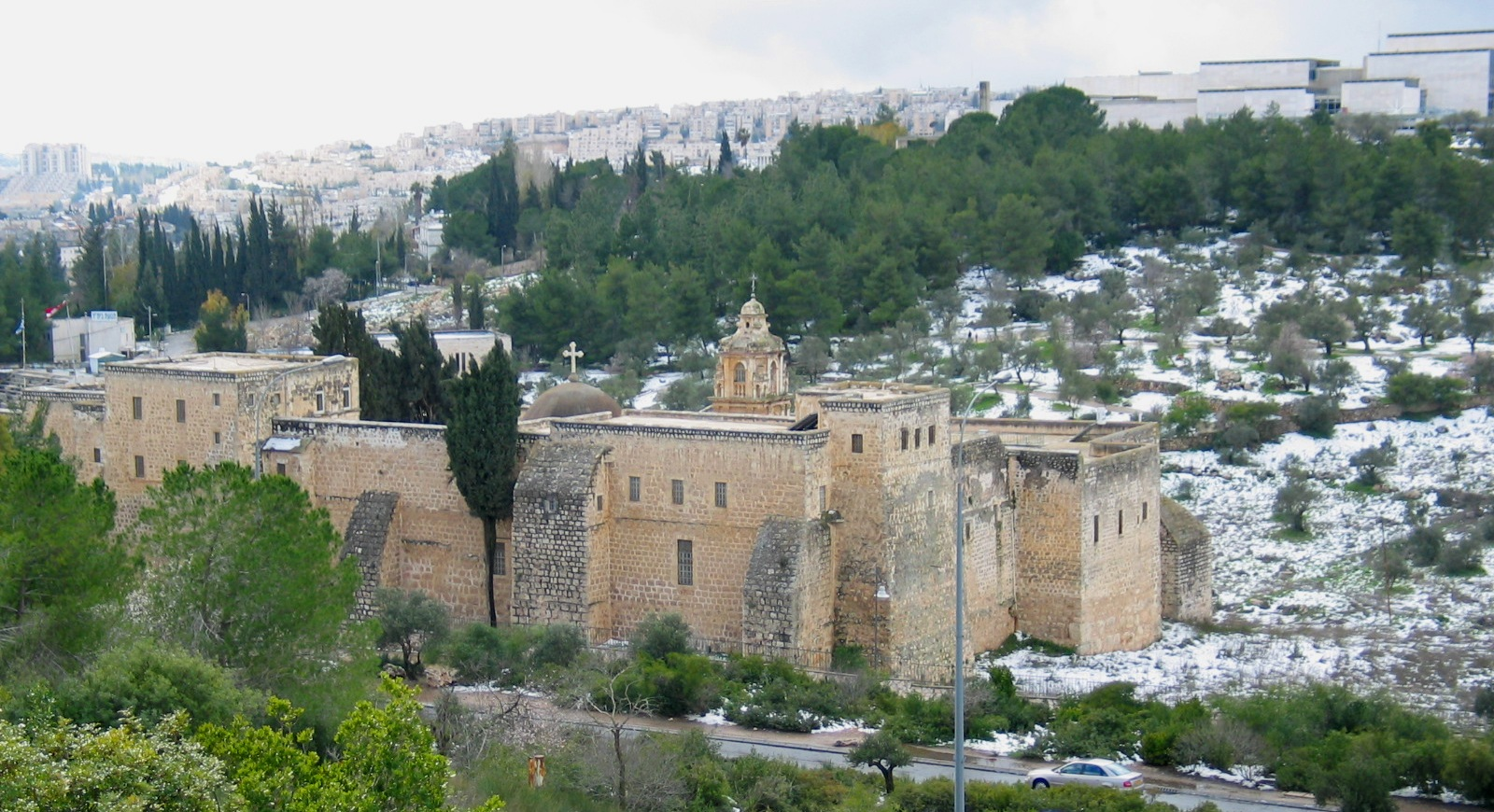
The valley of the cross and the monastery in the snow

The Valley of the Cross (Hebrew: עמק המצלבה Emek Hamatzlevah) is a valley in western Jerusalem, named after the Monastery of the Cross which is located in the valley.

The monastery was built in the 11th century, during the reign of King Bagrat IV by the Georgian monk Prochorus the Iberian. It is believed that the site was originally consecrated in the 4th century under the instruction of the Roman emperor Constantine the Great, who later gave the site to the Georgian King Mirian III of Iberia after the conversion of his country to Christianity in 327.

On the valley's west side is the hill of Givat Ram, with the Israel Museum and the Knesset overlooking the valley. On its east is the neighborhood of Rehavia.

The Tzofim scout movement maintains its Jerusalem headquarters in the Valley of the Cross. The Jerusalem headquarters of Bnei Akiva, a religious youth movement is also located there.

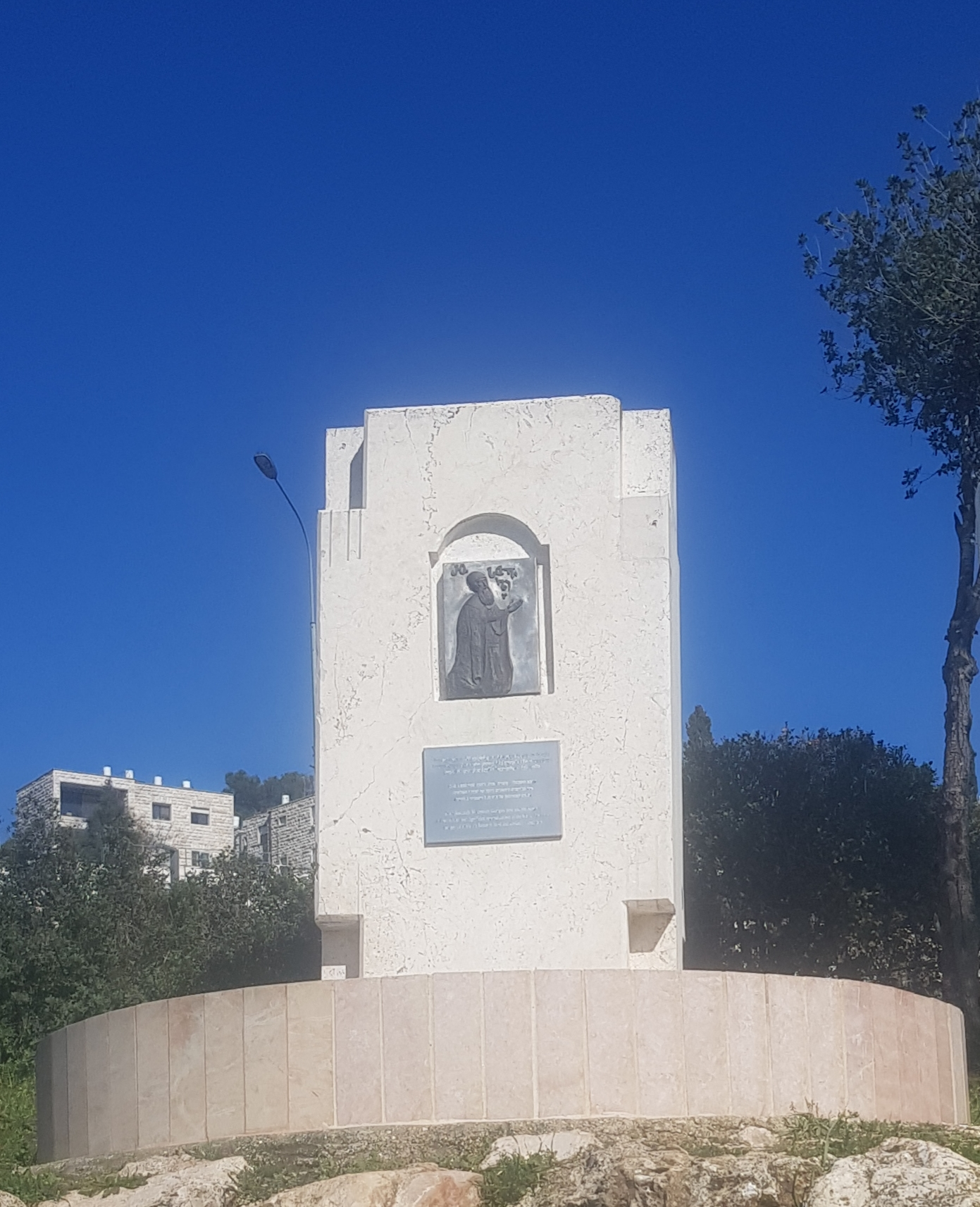
Memorial Monument for Shota Rustaveli near the Monastery of the Cross in Jerusalem (2023).

== Archaeology ==
Fourteen ossuaries were discovered in July 1970 during construction work along Ben-Zvi Boulevard. Ten of the ossuaries were ornamented, and three of them had inscriptions. The inscriptions are in Greek and bear Jewish names: Mariame, Simon, and Eskias (a unique spelling of Hezekiah).
