= L3 (Jerusalem Light Rail) =

Light rail line in Jerusalem

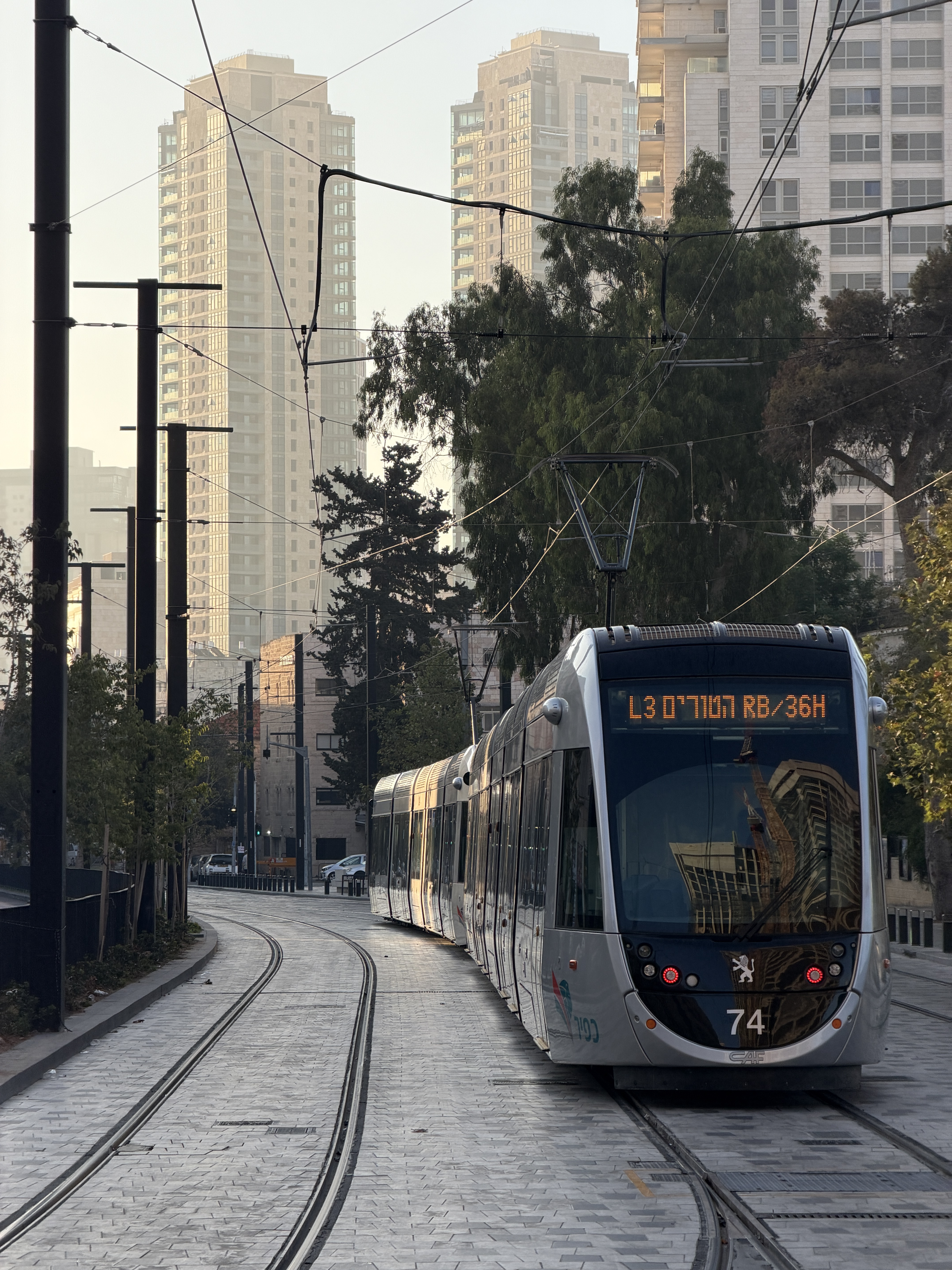
- L3 line of Jerusalem light rail near Haturim station in the early morning of August 21, 2026

Overview
- Status: In Service
- Locale: Jerusalem
- Termini: Malha (Manahat); Damascus Gate
- Stations: 18

Service
- Type: Light rail
- Depot: French Hill depot
- Rolling stock: CAF Urbos 100

History
- Planned opening: End of 2026 (Mount Scopus branch via Red Line, estimated); 2027 (full operation, estimated)
- Opened: August 21, 2026

Technical
- Line length: 7 km (4.3 mi)
- Num of tracks: 2
- Track gauge: 1,435 mm (4 ft 8 1/2 in) standard gauge
- Electrification: 750 V DC OHLE

L3 is a service line of the Jerusalem Light Rail network, running between Malha (Minchat) and Damascus Gate. It opened on August 21, 2026, and is planned to eventually extend north to Mount Scopus via the L1 (Red Line) tracks.

At HaTurim, L3 connects to the L1 as well as the Jerusalem central bus station, Yitzhak Navon railway station and the International Convention Center.

The 10 kilometres (6.2 mi) route, with 18 stations, begins at Malha (Manahat), near the Jerusalem Malha railway station and Malha Mall, and runs north through Pat and Givat Mordechai and across the Hebrew University's Givat Ram campus, passing the Jerusalem Botanical Gardens and the Gazelle Valley, before joining L1 at HaTurim and sharing its tracks all the way to Damascus Gate.

The line is planned to extend north to the Hebrew University's Mount Scopus campus in 2027, running along the existing Red Line alignment past French Hill before rejoining Green Line infrastructure.

== See also ==
- Jerusalem Light Rail
- Red Line (Jerusalem Light Rail)
- L4 (Jerusalem Light Rail)
- L5 (Jerusalem Light Rail)
