= L5 (Jerusalem Light Rail) =

Future light rail line in Jerusalem

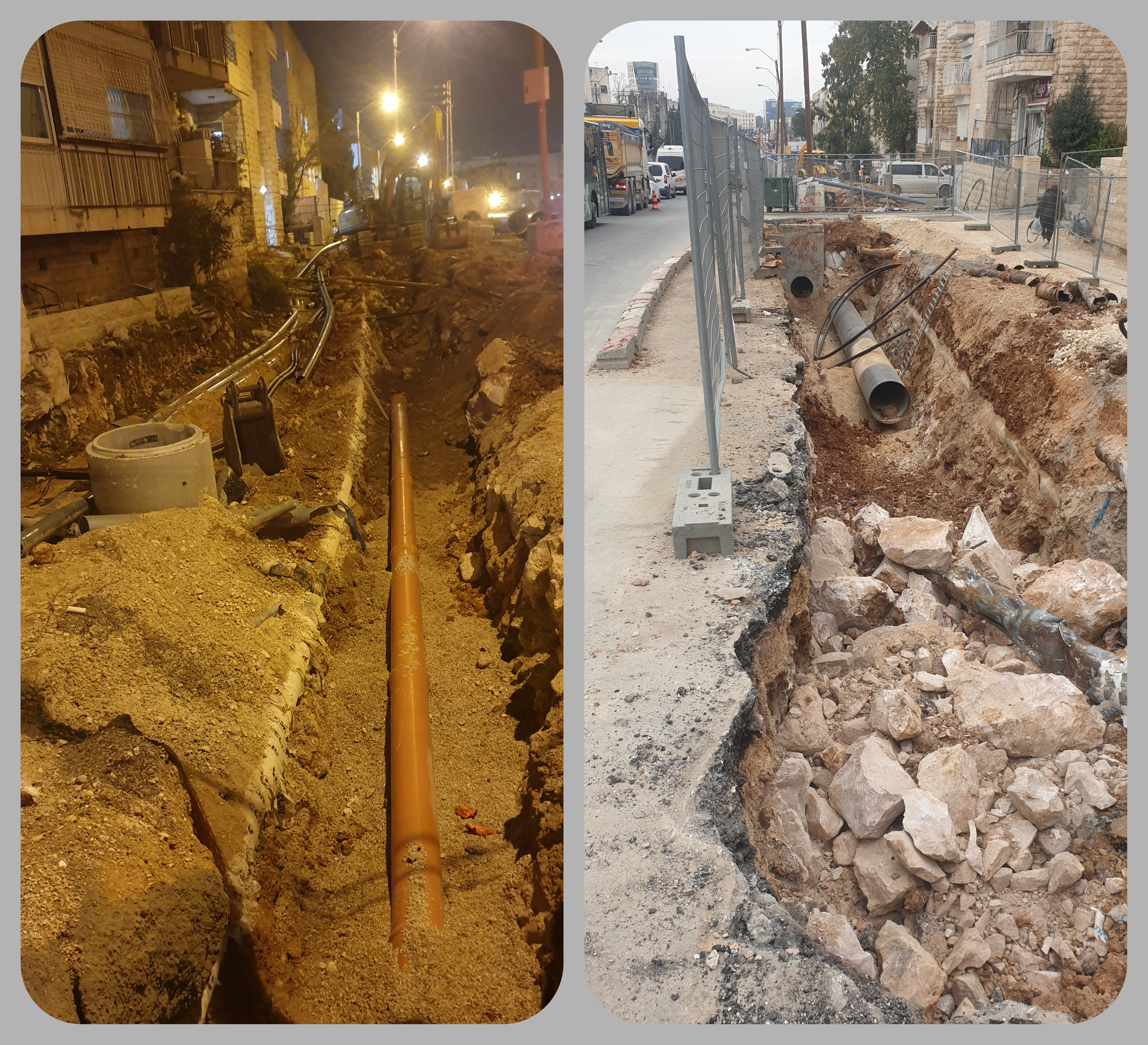
- Infrastructure works on the Green Line's Givat Shaul branch in Kiryat Moshe

Overview
- Status: Under construction
- Locale: Jerusalem
- Termini: Har Nof; Neve Yaakov
- Stations: 25

Service
- Type: Light rail
- Depot: French Hill depot
- Rolling stock: CAF Urbos 100
- Daily ridership: 200,000 (estimated, whole Green Line network)

History
- Planned opening: 2027 (estimated)

Technical
- Line length: 13 km (8.1 mi)
- Number of tracks: 2
- Track gauge: 1,435 mm (4 ft 8 1/2 in) standard gauge
- Electrification: 750 V DC OHLE

L5 is a future service line of the Jerusalem Light Rail's Green Line network, planned to run 13 km (8.1 mi) with 25 stations between Neve Yaakov in the north and Har Nof in the west. L5 is operated as part of the Green Line network alongside the L3 (Malha to HaTurim) and L4 (Mount Scopus to Gilo).

The line's northern section runs on the existing Red Line tracks between Neve Ya'akov and Pisgat Ze'ev and French Hill. From French Hill it continues on dedicated Green Line infrastructure through Ramat Eshkol, Bar-Ilan Street, Yirmiyahu Street, and Romema. Near the central bus station it splits onto the Givat Shaul branch, serving Kiryat Moshe and Givat Shaul, and terminating at Har Nof.

The roughly 2 km Givat Shaul branch, running from the Ben Dor junction on Herzl Boulevard along Kanfei Nesharim Street to the transportation terminal at the entrance to Har Nof, was originally planned as a Red Line branch under a 2014 master plan for the Givat Shaul employment district before being incorporated into the Green Line project; construction began in June 2019.

== See also ==
- Jerusalem Light Rail
- Red Line (Jerusalem Light Rail)
- L3 (Jerusalem Light Rail)
- L4 (Jerusalem Light Rail)
