= L4 (Jerusalem Light Rail) =

Future light rail line in Jerusalem

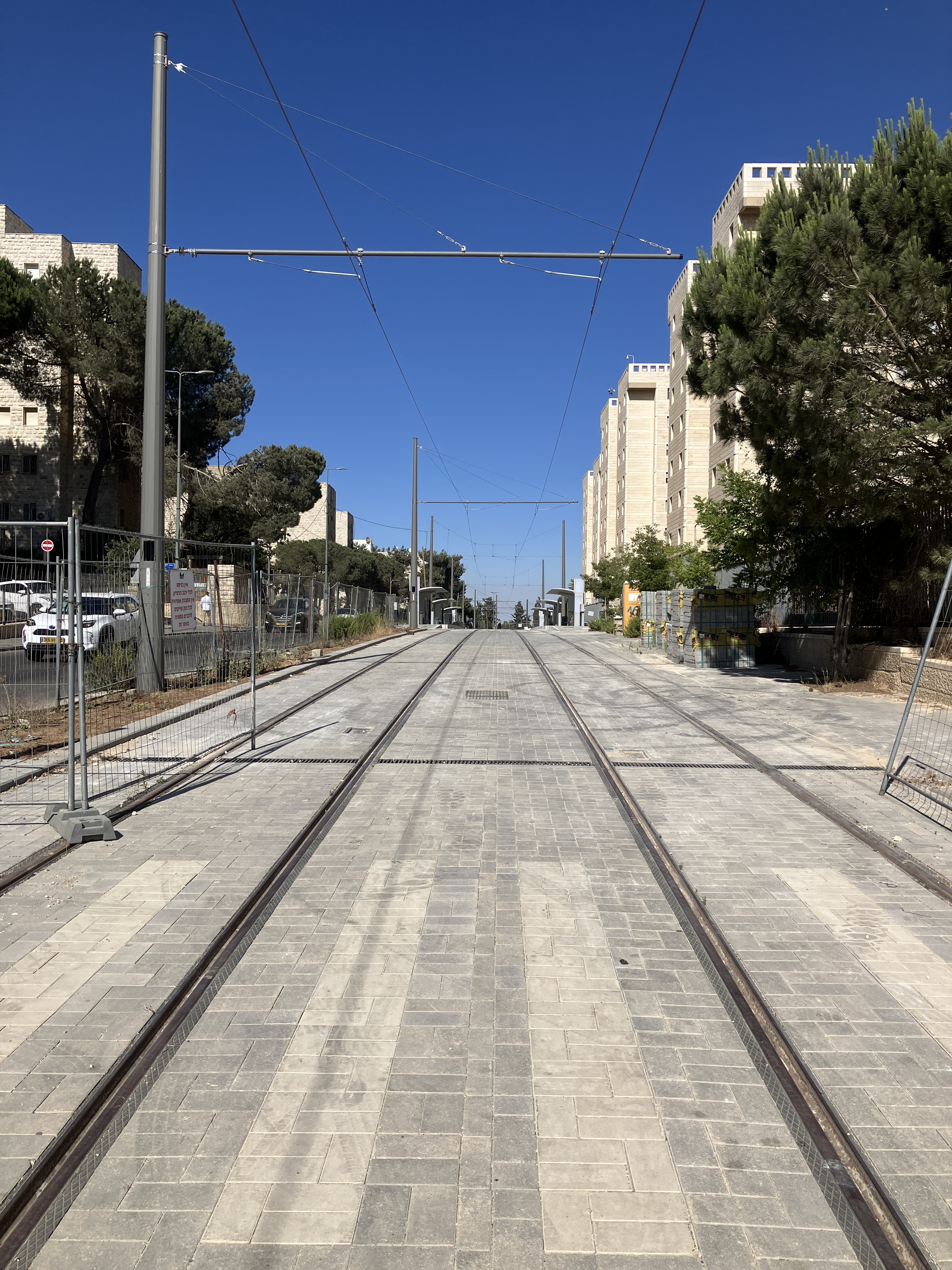
- French Hill station, near the French Hill depot serving the Green Line network (June 2026)

Overview
- Other name: Green Line
- Status: Under construction
- Locale: Jerusalem
- Termini: Mount Scopus; Gilo

Service
- Type: Light rail
- System: Jerusalem Light Rail
- Operator: Jerusalem Mass Transit Ltd. ("Kafir")
- Depot: French Hill depot
- Rolling stock: CAF Urbos 100
- Daily ridership: 200,000 (estimated, whole Green Line network)

History
- Planned opening: December 2026 (Central Bus Station–Gilo section, estimated); 2027 (full line, estimated)

Technical
- Number of tracks: 2
- Track gauge: 1,435 mm (4 ft 8 1/2 in) standard gauge
- Electrification: 750 V DC OHLE

L4 (or Green Line) is a line of the Jerusalem Light Rail network, under construction since 2018 and originally expected to be completed by 2025. It will be the second section of the Green Line to open, after the L3 branch, which launched on August 21, 2026. The section between the Central Bus Station and Gilo is scheduled to open as early as December 2026; test runs without passengers began on the section between Gonenim and Gilo in late August 2026, running at both daytime and nighttime hours ahead of the opening. The full line, including its northern extension to Mount Scopus, is now expected to open in 2027. L4 will link the two campuses of the Hebrew University of Jerusalem and continue south via Pat junction to Gilo, passing the terminus of the Tel Aviv–Jerusalem railway and crossing the existing Red Line tram route on its way to Mount Scopus.

== Route ==
L4 runs from Mount Scopus in the north to Gilo in the south, passing through the city centre along the existing Red Line alignment before continuing via Bar-Ilan Street. Along with L4, the Green Line network includes the L3 branch, running from Malha in the south to HaTurim, and the L5 branch, running from Neve Yaakov in the north to Har Nof in the west. L4 and L5 were given different shades of green because they share a common corridor along Yirmiyahu and Bar-Ilan streets, while L3 was assigned yellow to reflect its future shared corridor with the Red Line in the city centre.

Once complete, L4 will form part of a Green Line network covering approximately 20 kilometres and 41 stations in total, with a northern terminus at Mount Scopus / French Hill and a southern corridor serving Gilo and Malha.

== History ==
Initial planning of the Jerusalem Light Rail system began in the late 1990s and originally envisioned eight lines, including one linking Gilo in the south of the city to the city centre. A general plan was approved by the National Council for Planning and Building in October 2000, and the tender for the Red Line was published in May 2001; the Green Line was originally meant to follow immediately afterward, but its detailed planning was delayed by roughly a decade.

The line was approved by the Jerusalem city council in June 2016, with tenders to be issued shortly after.

The Jerusalem transportation master plan team completed detailed planning of the line in 2013. The Jerusalem local planning and building committee approved the line's plan in June 2015, and the district committee approved it in June 2016.

A tender worth 60 million NIS was issued to begin infrastructure work, including support walls, development, and paving along the route, while the full operating tender, estimated at 10 billion NIS, entered the pre-selection phase. Moriah Jerusalem Development CEO Doron Noiwirt stated that at least three more tenders for the next sections of the Green Line would be issued in 2017. Only two consortia submitted bids for the line's construction after the Alstom-Dan-Electra consortium withdrew. The tender was won in August 2019 by TransJerusalem J-Net Ltd., owned by Shapir Engineering and the Spanish rail firm CAF.

== See also ==
- Jerusalem Light Rail
- Red Line (Jerusalem Light Rail)
- L3 (Jerusalem Light Rail)
- L5 (Jerusalem Light Rail)
