= Community Council of Jerusalem =

The precursor of the Community Council of Jerusalem (Va'ad HaKehilla) was established circa 1864 to represent the interests of the Jewish community to Ottoman authorities; beginning with Mandatory Palestine it dealt with British Empire authorities. Dealing largely with neighborhood and civic matters such as taxation and local security, and more particularly interests of the old Yishuv community, members provided much-needed financial support for the Haganah during the 1948 Arab-Israeli War in a drive run by Yaacov Pat at the initiation of member Rose Vitales.
