= Yaacov Pat =

Commander of the Haganah in Mandatory Palestine

- יעקב פת

Director of the Special Tasks Department in the Ministry of Defense
- In office 1948–1956

Personal details
- Born: 1894
- Died: 1956 (aged 61–62)
- Occupation: Haganah Commander in Mandatory Palestine; Director of the Special Tasks Department in the Ministry of Defense
- Known for: Haganah leadership

Yaacov Pat (Hebrew: יעקב פת; 1894-1956) (also Yaakov Patt) was a commander of the Haganah in Mandatory Palestine.

Pat was a member of Hashomer, a Jewish defense organization in Ottoman Palestine, and served in the first Hebrew regiments during World War I. In 1931, under David Ben-Gurion's direction, he rebuilt the Jerusalem branch of the Haganah, focusing on recruitment and training. Pat also helped establish a branch of Magen David Adom in Jerusalem.

After the establishment of the State of Israel, Pat served as the director of the Special Tasks Department in the Israel Ministry of Defense. He married Tzipora Finkelstein, and they had two daughters.

== Career ==
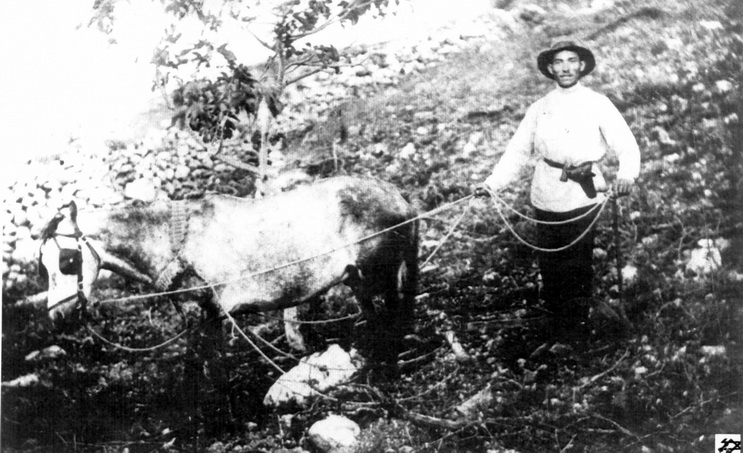
Yaacov Pat plowing the land in Atarot, first Kalandiya group, 1913.

Yaacov Pat was a member of Hashomer, a Jewish defense organization formed in Ottoman Palestine in 1909. Together with Yitzhak Ben-Zvi, later President of Israel, he served in the first Hebrew regiments in World War I.

=== Rebuilding the Haganah in Jerusalem ===
In 1931, Yaacov Pat was sent to Jerusalem by David Ben-Gurion to rebuild the local branch of the Haganah, a Jewish militia. Pat was in charge of recruiting men, while Rachel Yanait Ben-Zvi was responsible for the enlistment of women.

Pat's efforts to recruit and train new manpower succeeded, but no funding was available for weapons. Rose Vitales, who worked for the Va'ad HaKehilla Community Council of Jerusalem, convinced Pat that she could organize a fundraising campaign. Soliciting from a screened list of donors, the drive increased the income of the organization from 40 Palestine pounds a month (approximately $160) to 1,000 Palestine pounds per month. This money was used to purchase arms for defending Jerusalem during the 1936 Arab revolt.

=== Establishing Magen David Adom in Jerusalem ===
With the help of Rose Vitales, Pat also pushed for the establishment of a branch of Magen David Adom in Jerusalem, which existed at the time only in Haifa. By 1936, that branch was functioning.

=== Later career ===
Upon the establishment of the State of Israel, Yaacov served as the director of the Special Tasks Department in the Ministry of Defense.

== Personal life ==
Yaacov married Tzipora, daughter of Moshe Finkelstein (born in 1902 in Essex, England), whom he met while serving in the Hebrew Battalion and she worked as a nurse at the Scottish Hospital in Tiberias. The couple had two daughters. Yaacov died from a heart attack in 1956 and was laid to rest in the Hashomer section of the Kfar Giladi cemetery. His wife Tzipora died in 1960 and was buried next to him.

== Commemoration ==
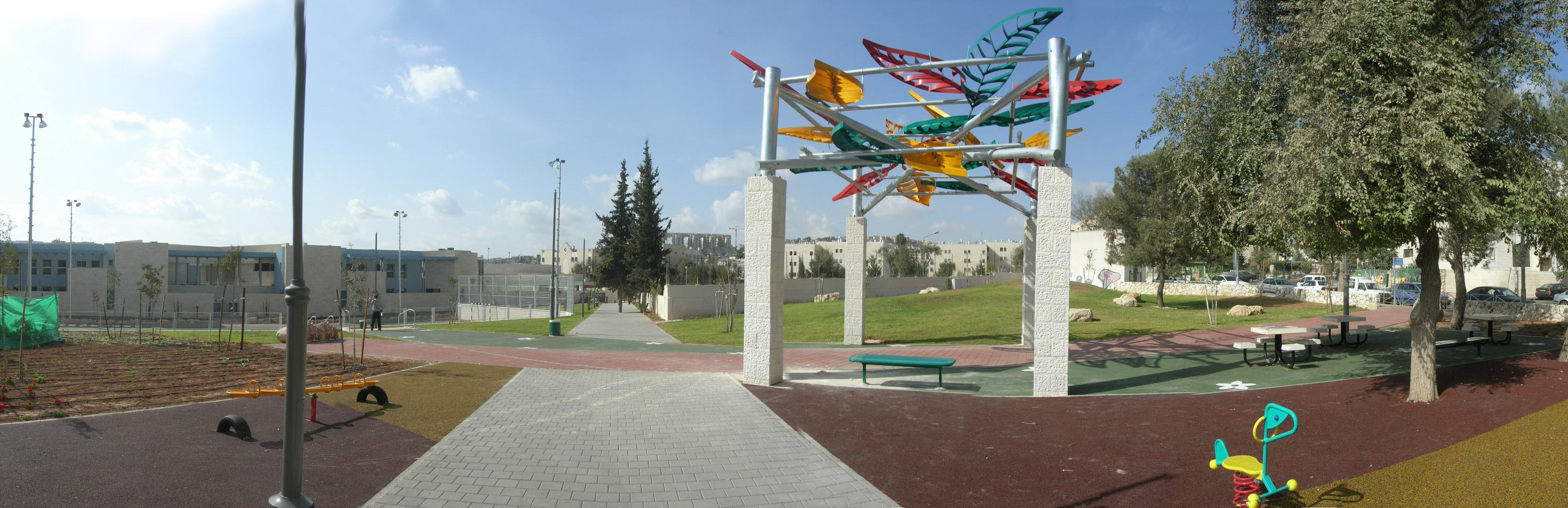
Pat neighbourhood in Jerusalem: Goren-Goldstein Park and the Hebrew-Arabic School

The Pat neighborhood in Jerusalem is named for Yaacov Pat.
