= Bar-Ilan Street =

Coordinates: 31°47′39″N 35°12′59″E

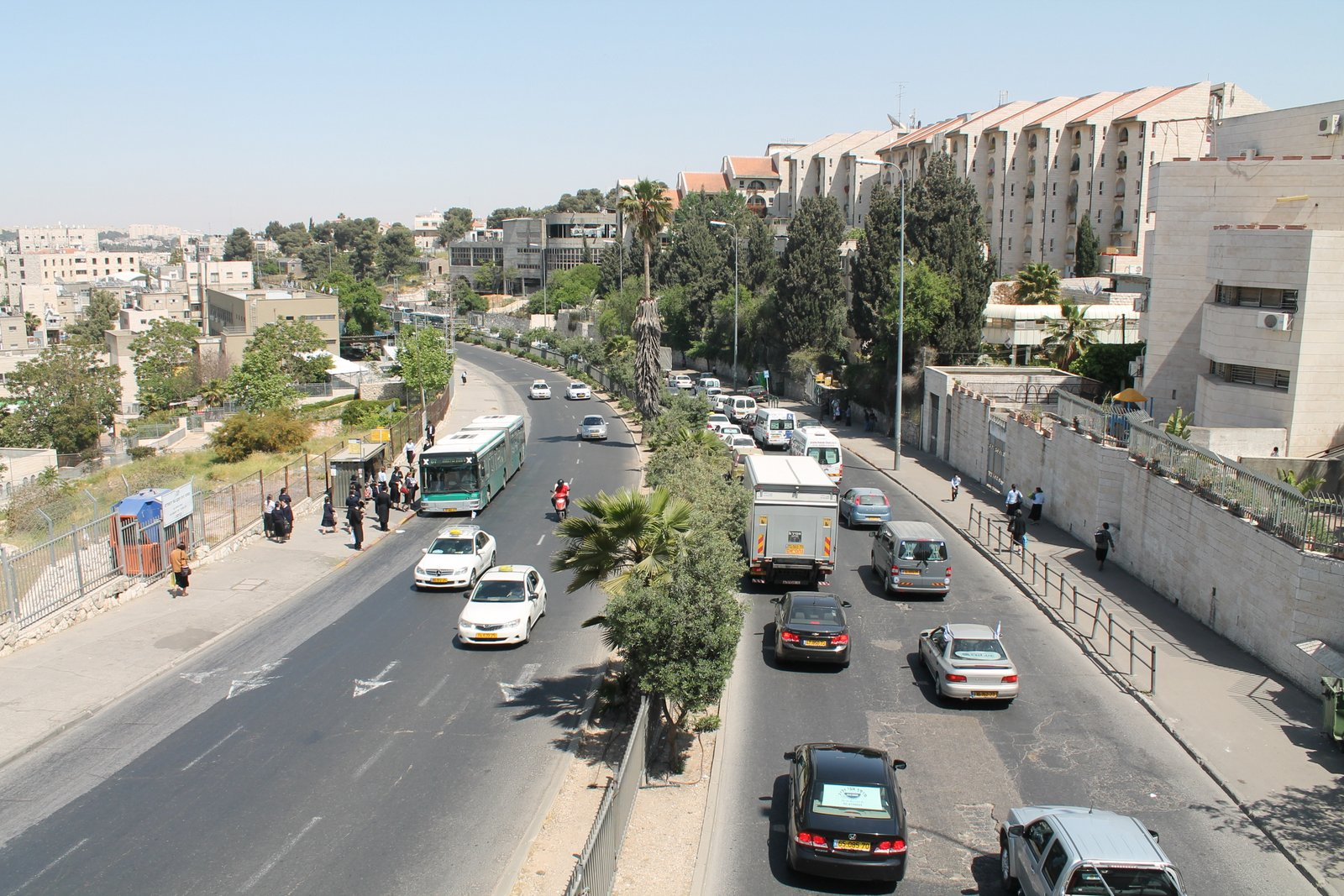
Section of Bar Ilan street

Bar-Ilan Street is a section of Route 417 between Yirmiyahu Street and Hativat HarEl Street in northern Jerusalem. It is a major artery that runs through a heavily Ultra-Orthodox neighborhood.

Bar-Ilan Street became a symbol of the battle between secular Jews and Haredi residents of the neighborhood who wanted the street closed to vehicular traffic on Shabbat. Bar-Ilan was an early test case of government policy on issues of religion and state, pitting Orthodox sensibilities against secular demands for personal freedom. In 1996, the Israeli Supreme Court was asked to decide whether the street would be open or closed.

For over a decade, Haredi residents organized Shabbat demonstrations on Bar-Ilan Street. The protests were held despite an arrangement, endorsed by the Israeli Supreme Court, in which the artery, which runs through the north of the capital, is shut to traffic during Sabbath services and opened at other times. The demonstrations often turned violent, resulting in arrests for throwing rocks at passing cars and assaulting police.

In more recent years, certain elements of the Haredi population have protested the proposed expansion of the Jerusalem light rail to Bar Ilan Street, often blocking traffic and damaging property.
