= Givat Mordechai =

Neighborhood in Jerusalem, Israel

Coordinates: 31°45′54″N 35°11′50″E

Givat Mordechai Hebrew: גבעת מרדכי
- Neighborhood of Jerusalem
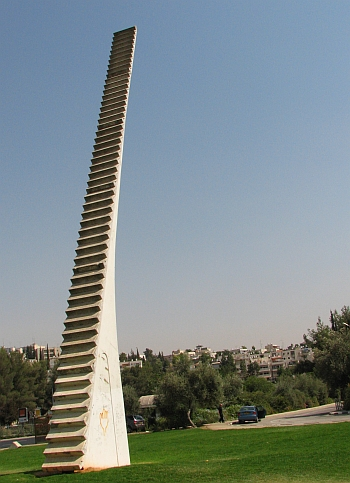
- Statue of the Ladder of Jacob
- Interactive map of Givat Mordechai
- Country: Israel
- District: Jerusalem District
- City: Jerusalem

Givat Mordechai (Hebrew: גבעת מרדכי, trans: Mordechai's Hill) is a Jewish neighborhood in southwest-central Jerusalem, midway between the neighborhoods of Nayot and Malcha. The neighborhood was named after an American philanthropist, Maxwell (Mordechai) Abbell of Chicago.

== History ==
Givat Mordechai was established in 1955 by members of Hapoel Hamizrachi, the forerunner of the National Religious Party, known in Hebrew as Mafdal. Most of the streets are named after leaders of Hapoel Hamizrachi. Shahal Street, for example, is a Hebrew acronym for the religious Zionist leader Rabbi Shmuel Chaim Landau. The population is largely modern Orthodox, with some secular Jews. There are many synagogues and educational institutions in Givat Mordechai. The main campus of the Jerusalem College of Technology is located there, as is the Hebron yeshiva.

== Landmarks ==
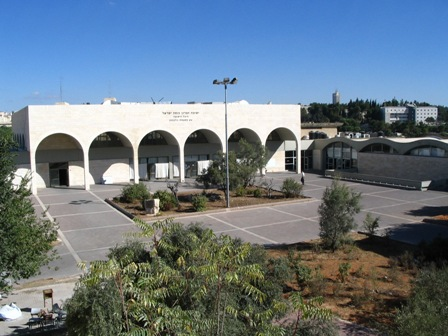
Hebron Yeshiva, Givat Mordechai

The Jerusalem Fire Brigade is headquartered in Givat Mordechai.

Ezra Orion's outdoor sculpture "Stairway" (1979-1980) is located at the entrance to Givat Mordechai in the Elsie Bernadette Garden. It is widely known as "Sulam Yaakov," or "Jacob's Ladder", referencing the story in Book of Genesis (28:11–19). The steps face down so as to discourage the unwise from climbing it.

Givat Mordechai abuts the Pri-Har valley (Gazelle Valley), a large expanse of open fields that is home to a herd of mountain gazelles and other wildlife. Plans to build residential towers here triggered an outcry from environmentalists and local residents, who managed to block the project. Instead, the area is slated to become a park and a nature reserve.

The Hebron Yeshiva, as well as the Jerusalem College of Technology and Yeshivat Eretz Hatzvi are located in the neighbourhood.

== Notable people ==
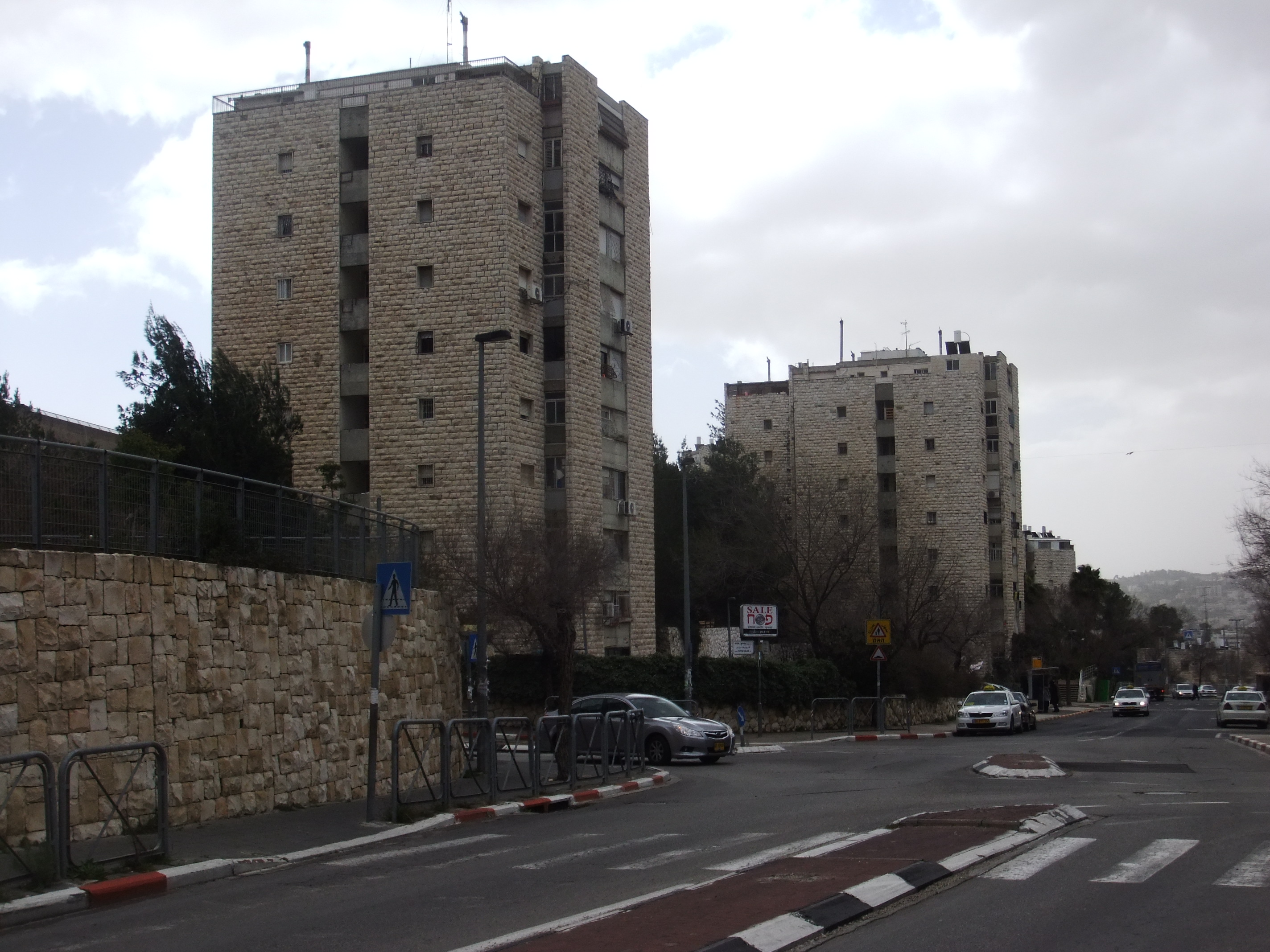
Entrance to the neighborhood from Beit Street

- Rabbi Eitan Aviner, Director of Judaic Advancement, Bnei Akiva Schools of Toronto
- Rabbi Yehuda Amital, head of Yeshivat Har Etzion
- Zevulun Orlev, Israeli MK and former minister
