= Jerusalem Light Rail =

Light rail system in Jerusalem

Jerusalem Light Rail הרכבת הקלה בירושלים قطار القدس الخفيف
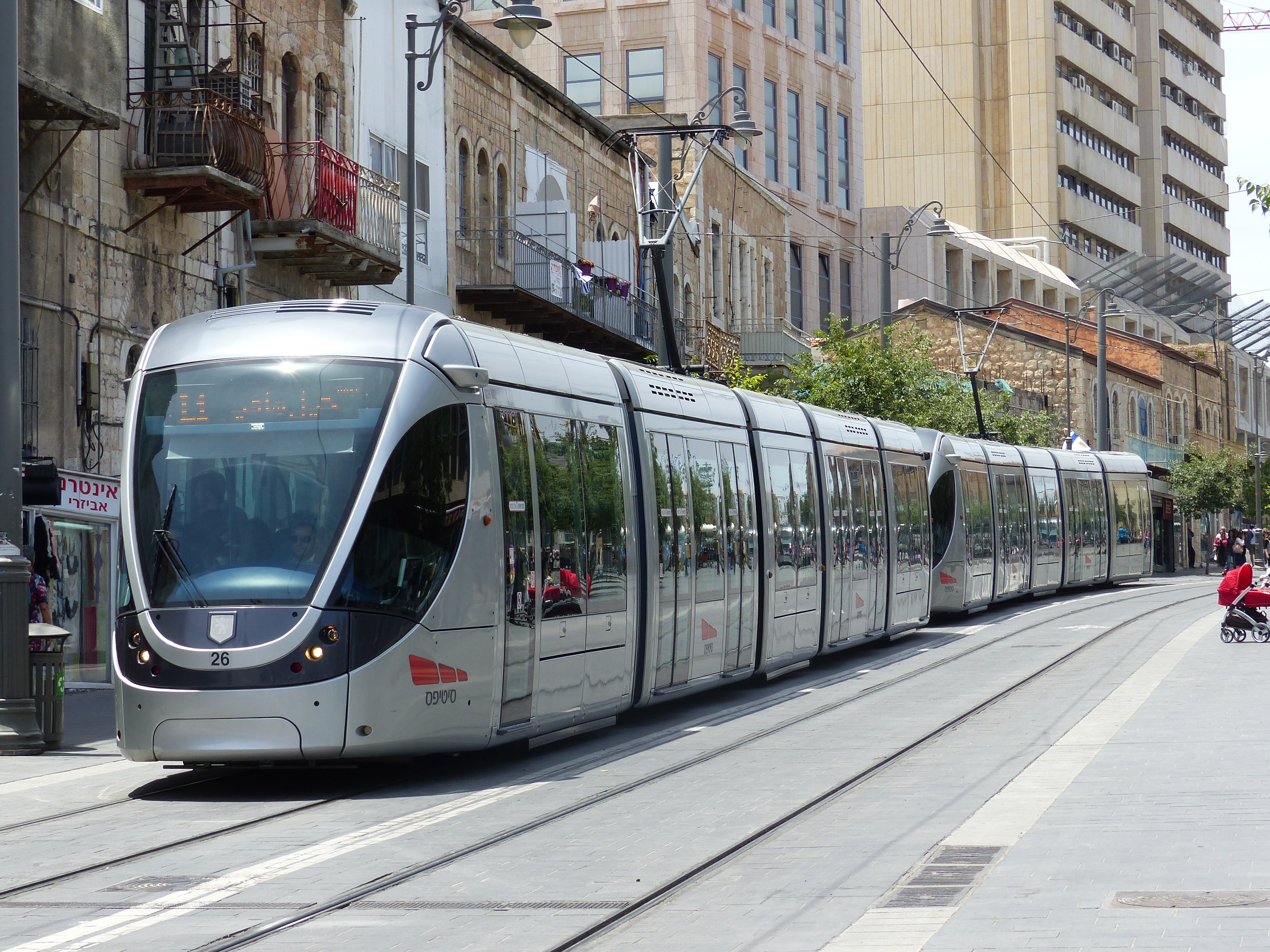
- Light rail at Jaffa Road

Overview
- Area served: Jerusalem
- Transit type: Light rail
- Number of lines: 2 (Red Line, Green Line)
- Number of stations: 35
- Daily ridership: 150,000 (2019)
- Annual ridership: 42.457 million (2017)
- Website: jet.gov.il/en/light-rail/

Operation
- Began operation: August 19, 2011 (free trial service); December 1, 2011 (full revenue service)
- Operator: Kfir

Technical
- System length: 22.5 km (14.0 mi)
- No. of tracks: 2
- Track gauge: 1,435 mm (4 ft 8 1/2 in) standard gauge
- Electrification: 750 V DC OHLE
- Average speed: 50 km/h (31 mph) maximum

The Jerusalem Light Rail (Hebrew: הרכבת הקלה בירושלים, HaRakevet HaKala Birushalayim, Arabic: قطار القدس الخفيف, Qiṭār Al-Quds Al-Khafīf) is a light rail system in Jerusalem. Currently, the Red Line is the only one in full operation, and the Green Line is partially operational (11 out of 35 planned stations), with several more light rail lines planned in Jerusalem.

Construction on the Red line began in 2002 and ended in 2010, when the testing phase began. It was built by the CityPass consortium, which operated it until 2019. The project required construction of the Jerusalem Chords Bridge as well as other renovation projects around Jerusalem.

After repeated delays due to archaeological discoveries and technical issues, service began, initially free of charge, on August 19, 2011. It became fully operational on December 1, 2011. The line is 22.5 kilometers (14.0 mi) long with 35 stops. The last extensions to the red line were opened in February 2025 to the Israeli settlement of Neve Yaakov and to Hadassah Ein Kerem Hospital to the southwest.

With a total estimated cost for the Red Line's initial section of ₪3.8 billion (approx. US $1.1 billion), the project was criticized for budget overruns, for its route serving Jewish settlements in East Jerusalem and for contributing to air and noise pollution during construction.

The Green line's plans have been approved by the city of Jerusalem, with right-of-way clearing works underway. Construction tenders, including those for the red line extension, were awarded in August 2019 to TransJerusalem J-Net Ltd., owned by CAF and Shapir Engineering, and the first phase became operational in August 2026.

The Blue line has been approved and works on it have started in several locations.

== History ==
In ancient times, Jerusalem was a point on the Ridge Route, also known as the Way of the Patriarchs, centrally located between the Via Maris (along the coast to the west) and the King's Highway (east of the River Jordan). The primary roads led to the gates of the Old City, such as the Jaffa Gate and the Damascus Gate. It was along these roads that the city grew when it expanded beyond the walls of the Old City in the 19th century, the major thoroughfares of the city thus becoming the Jaffa Road, leading to the west in the direction of the coastal plain, the watershed routes (Ridge Route) leading north to Ramallah, Nablus, and Damascus, and south to Bethlehem and Hebron, and one to the east to Jericho.

Early plans for an electric tramway were drawn up by a Greek Lebanese engineer, George Franjieh, in 1892, who had been involved in planning the Jaffa–Jerusalem railway. The tram would connect the city with Ein Karem and Bethlehem. In 1910, a tender for a tramway was published by the Ottoman authorities.

In 1918, the British Army built a rail system linking the Jerusalem Railway Station, now referred to as "First Station", with Al-Bireh, on the outskirts of Ramallah, traversing Jerusalem along a winding route. It was built by Rail Builders Company 272 of the British Royal Engineers, commanded by Colonel Jordan Bell, with some 850 Egyptian and local Arab laborers, about half of them women. The railway was used by the British army, and for a few months it supplied Allenby's troops. It was dismantled shortly after the front moved northward in late 1918. Some of the city's streets may have been paved along its route.

In the 1970s, when traffic congestion mounted in the city center, proposals were discussed for widening the main roads. In 1996, the government approved new plans for an integrated network relying on rapid transit, including a light rail system and bus rapid transit.

== Construction ==
In the 1990s, a light rail system was proposed as a means of providing faster and less polluting public transit through the heart of the city, and reversing the decline of certain central areas. CityPass, a specially formed consortium, won a 30-year concession to build and operate Line 1 (the "Red Line"). CityPass consists of financiers Harel (20%), Polar Investments (17.5%) and the Israel Infrastructure Fund (10%), constructors Ashtrom (27.5%) and engineers Alstom (20%), plus service operators – Connex (5%).

However, the principal agreement with the Dan Bus Company did not materialize. Veolia entered another principal agreement with Egged. Veolia sold its stake in CityPass and its shares in the contract for the maintenance of the light rail to Egged. The contract stipulates that Veolia would provide consultancy services to Egged until the company acquired the necessary expertise. Dan Bus Company has taken Veolia to court for exiting the principal agreement.

Construction of Line 1 began in 2002 by DTC (Dutch tramway company). Dubbed the "Red Line", it initially has 23 stations on a new 1,435 mm (4 ft 8 1/2 in) (standard gauge) twin-track 13.8 kilometres (8.6 mi) alignment. It runs from the settlement of Pisgat Ze'ev in north-east Jerusalem, south along Road 1 (intercity) to Jaffa Road (Rehov Yafo). From there, it runs along Jaffa Road westward to the Jerusalem Central Bus Station, and continues to the southwest, crossing the Chords Bridge along Herzl Boulevard to the Beit HaKerem neighborhood, finishing just beyond Mount Herzl at the northern edge of Bayit VeGan. The first test run for this route was on February 24, 2010. The laying of light rail tracks was completed on June 15, 2010.

=== Delays ===
Inauguration of the light rail service was postponed four times. The initial date was January 2009, deferred to August 2010 due to funding problems and lack of staff. When it was announced that signals for the trains were not compatible with Israeli stop light systems, CityPass was given until April 2011, but after the problem persisted and other safety issues were not resolved, an August 2011 date was settled on, and service was to begin without giving priority to trains at traffic lights. As a result, travel time for the full route began at 80 minutes instead of the planned 42, until final synchronization of the lights is completed. When the light rail started operating on Friday, August 19, 2011, there were also air conditioning issues and electrical and communications problems, one of them making trains suddenly "disappear" and then "reappear" on the screens of the control center near the settlement of French Hill. In addition to these mishaps, the computerized ticketing system collapsed a few days before the inauguration. After arbitration between CityPass and government officials, it was decided that the trains would begin limited operation as scheduled. During the trial period, only 14 of the 21 trains were put into operation, departing every 21 minutes, and travel was free of charge. Full revenue service began on December 1, 2011.

=== Development along the route ===
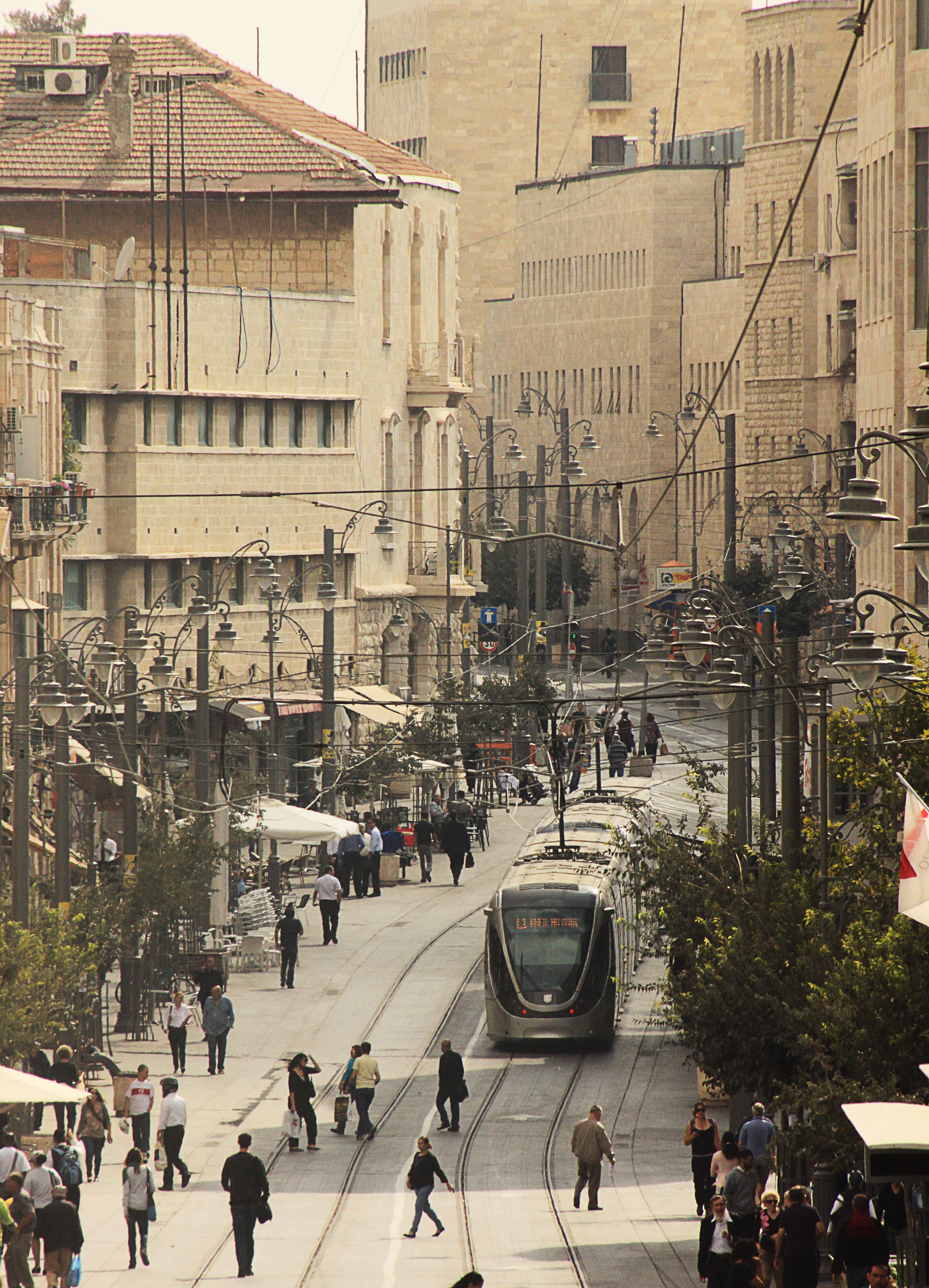
Jerusalem light rail on Jaffa Road, October 26, 2011

As part of the light rail project, CityPass plans to install blind-friendly traffic lights along the route, and has developed a number of sites along the route, such as Davidka Square. In late 2009, trees were planted along the line. The species selected were deemed suitable to the Jerusalem climate, hardy enough to withstand the city's cold winters while providing shade in summer. Over 3,500 trees were planted along the route in 2009–11. The genera include platanus, ash and types of oak. In March 2011, however, the Ministry of Transportation objected to having trees adjacent to the route, due to visibility problems.

=== Chords Bridge ===
The Chords Bridge is a cantilever spar cable-stayed bridge designed by the Spanish architect and engineer Santiago Calatrava, built for the light rail, close to the most frequently used entrance to Jerusalem, in the neighborhood of Kiryat Moshe. The bridge carries the trams in a grade separated manner over a busy road intersection. Incorporated in the bridge is a glass-sided pedestrian crossing, enabling pedestrians to cross unimpeded from the Kiryat Moshe area to the Central Bus Station grounds. The bridge, which cost about $70 million (NIS 246 million), was inaugurated on June 25, 2008.

== Integrated transportation plans ==
Map of the Jerusalem Light Rail

=== Bus and train connection ===
The Jerusalem Central Bus Station is slated to become a major passenger transportation hub. The Jerusalem–Yitzhak Navon railway station has begun operation for the new high-speed railway to Jerusalem from Tel Aviv and Ben Gurion Airport. Passengers will also be able to board the existing intercity bus services at the station.

A park and ride facility was built near Mount Herzl, consisting of a multi-storey car park with the first line terminal on its roof, which is actually at the street level of Herzl Boulevard. An additional parking lot was erected adjacent to the Ammunition Hill stop.

=== Extension plans ===
The Jerusalem Municipality has plans to build eight bus rapid transit (BRT) and light rail lines across the city. Extensions of the red line were recently completed in both directions: to the settlement of Neve Yaakov in the North and to Hadassah Medical Center in the South. This extension includes an underground section without stops west of Ora junction.

==== Red line ====
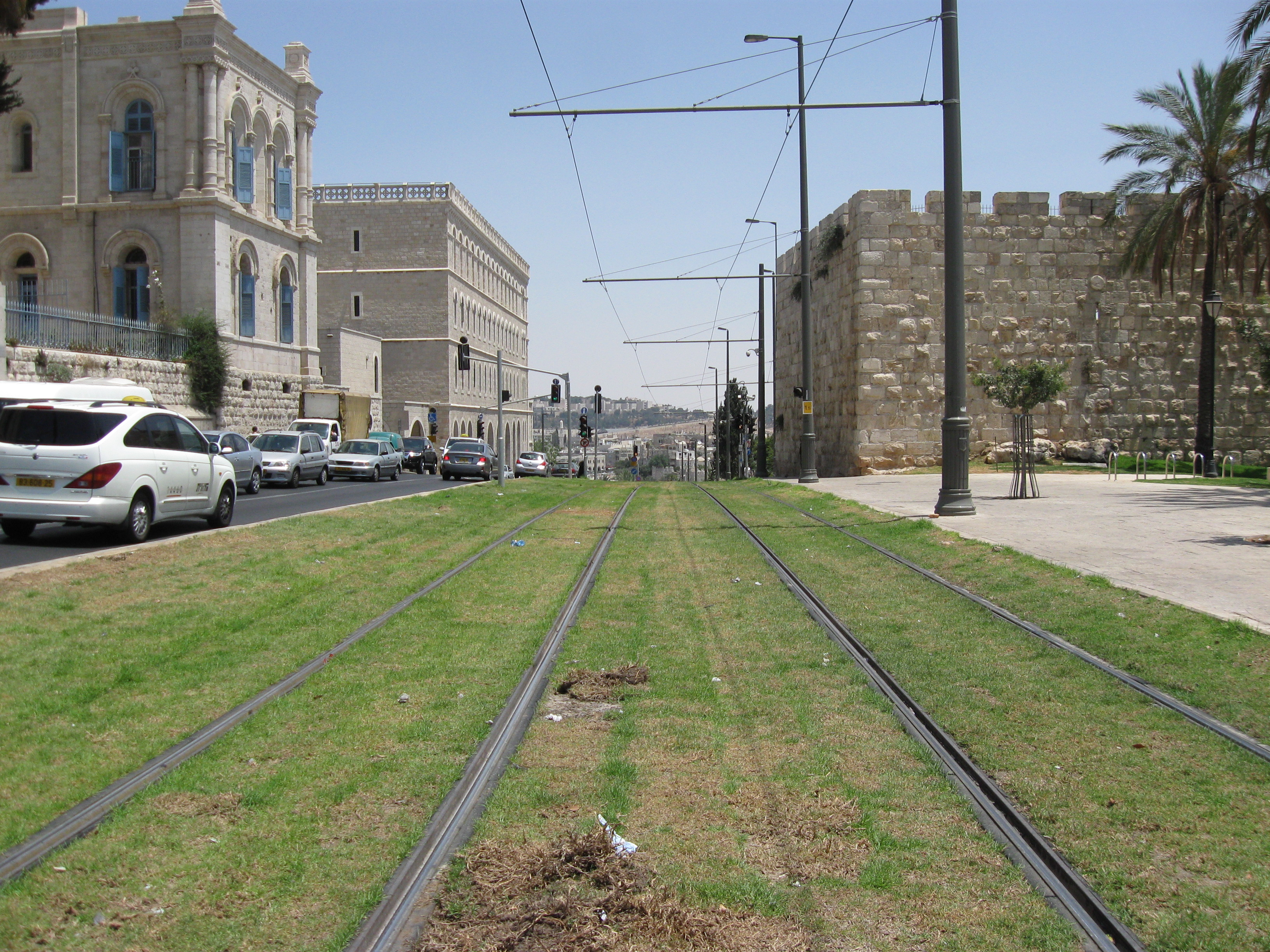
The Red Line operates on green track between City Hall and Damascus Gate.

Initial extensions to the Red Line were planned to the settlement of Neve Yaakov in Northeastern Jerusalem and the neighborhood of Ein Karem (near Hadassah Hospital) in the Southwest. Former mayor Uri Lupolianski stated that they would be completed at the same time as the rest of the line. In 2008, French company Egis Rail won an 11.9 million Euro contract to carry out some of the design work. However, in March 2009, CityPass turned down implementing the project. In May 2010 the Jerusalem Municipality announced that the extensions would be built by the state authorities rather than a private company. The extension to Hadassah Hospital from Mount Herzl was particularly challenging as it involved a complex path with complicated bridging works. As of summer 2012, while works on the extension had not yet begun, the line's final terminal station, next to Hadassah's new inpatient building, was already being built, during the construction of the inpatient building – in order not to disrupt hospital operations after the new building would be completed. Also planned are branches to the Red Line that would create a "campus line" connecting the Mount Scopus and Givat Ram campuses of the Hebrew University.

==== Blue line ====
The Blue Line from the settlement of Ramot to the settlement of Gilo is currently served by buses moving on a dedicated bus lane, and is planned to be converted to light rail. It will include an underground section in the city center with three underground stops: Avodat Israel, Tzfania, and Bar Ilan. The 23 km (14 mi) Blue Line will run from the Ramot district in the northwest, through the city centre up to Talpiot and Gilo, with branches to Malkha and Mount Scopus. It will have 42 stops and ridership is predicted at 250,000 passengers/day. The Blue Line, scheduled to open in 2029, was approved on December 3, 2017, by the district committee for planning and construction.

==== Green line ====
The 19.6 km (12.2 mi) Green Line will link the two campuses of the Hebrew University and continue south via Pat junction to the settlement of Gilo. It will pass the Binyanei-Hauma terminus of the A1 fast line railway, then cross the existing Red Line tram route and run to Mount Scopus. There would be 36 stops, and ridership is predicted at 200,000 passengers/day. The line was approved by the Jerusalem city council in June 2016 and is scheduled to open in 2027. Infrastructure and construction tenders have been issued and awarded.

=== North–south BRT line ===
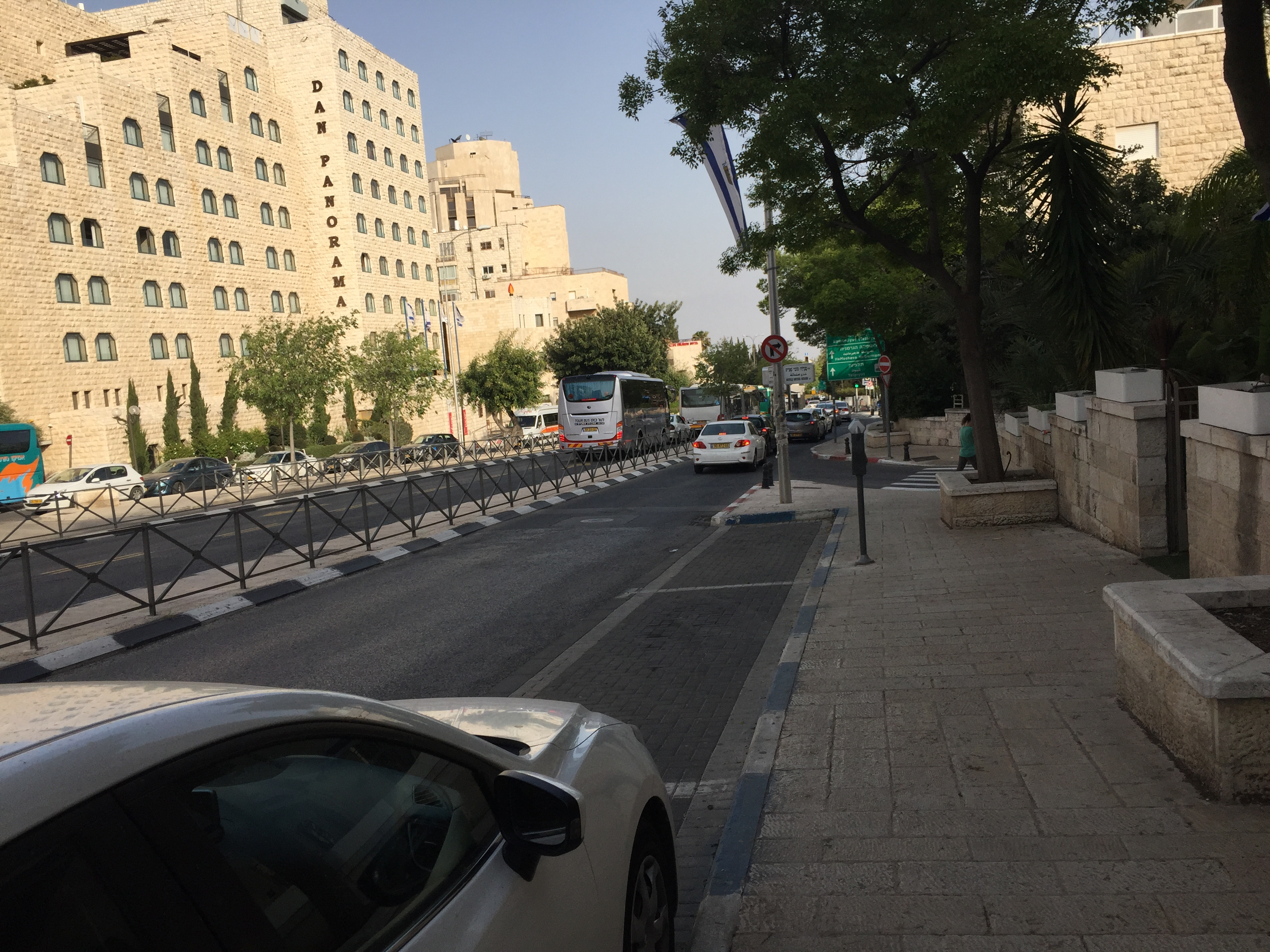
Bus rapid transit along Keren HaYesod Street

The first bus rapid transit (BRT) line, a feeder line to the Light Rail, is a dedicated bus line running along Hebron Road in south Jerusalem, northwards to Keren HaYesod Street, and from there to King George V Street, where it crosses the path of the light rail and continues along Straus Street towards Kikar HaShabbat to Yehezkel Street and Shmuel HaNavi Street, towards Golda Meir Boulevard in the direction of Ramot. Buses on this route are operated mainly by Superbus, and also by Egged. Tour buses, Arab buses and mini-buses that run from the Damascus Gate also use the line.

The bus stops on this route have been designed to match the light rail stops on the Red Line.

== Rolling stock ==
Initial rolling stock consists of 46 Citadis 302 100% low-floor five-module units manufactured at Alstom's Aytré factory. All axles are driven to handle gradients up to 9%. The first car was delivered via the Port of Ashdod in September 2007.

The maintenance and storage depot is on a 10 acres (40,000 m^{2}) site near French Hill in northern East Jerusalem. The route and vehicles are monitored from the control center, and trams are driven under line-of-sight principles with built-in priority at many road intersections. The fare collection and ticketing system is supplied by Affiliated Computer Services.

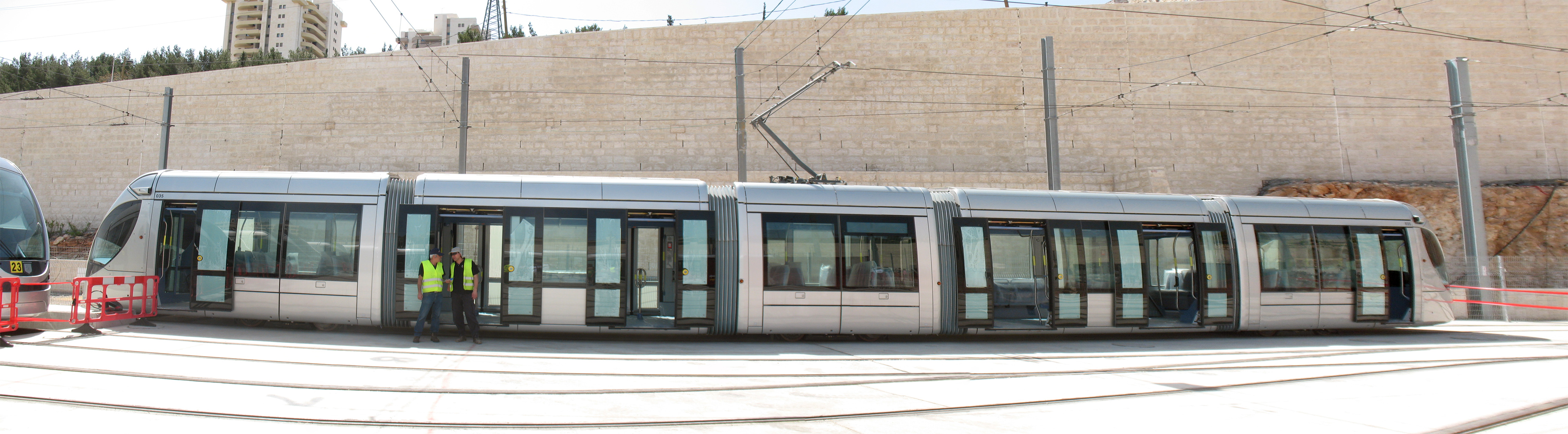
Alstom train for use in the light rail

== Operation ==
Video of light rail on Jaffa Street

Video of light rail

The French-based company Veolia Transport, which held 5% of CityPass's shares, was originally meant to operate the light rail. However, due to pressure from groups united in the Derail Veolia campaign, operating within the context of the Boycott, Divestment and Sanctions campaign, in September 2009 Veolia agreed to sell part of its share in the project to the Dan Bus Company for $15–20 million. The sale was however unsuccessful, and Veolia agreed in October 2010 to sell its stake to Egged instead. As of December 2011, the sale to Egged was reported to have been held up by the Israeli state.

Travel over the complete Red line is due to take 42 minutes from Pisgat Ze'ev at one end to Mount Herzl at the other (as of August 2012, the travel time is 46 minutes). The line operates Sunday through Thursday, from 5:30 am to 11:30 pm, on Friday up to an hour before sundown and not during the Shabbat or Jewish holidays, resuming half an hour after Shabbat or the Holiday ends. Commencing August 2, 2015, frequency will be every 3 minutes during rush hours and every 6 minutes in the daytime and at night. It is expected to carry up to 23,000 passengers an hour during peak morning rush hours. The light rail operates at a maximum speed of 50 km/h (31 mph). New regulations were passed by the government in regard to vehicle behavior vis-a-vis the light rail.

Operations were affected by a labor dispute in 2011. In May 2012, security personnel complained of poor working condition and lack of transparency from their employers—allegations which were denied by the security company.

=== Fares ===
Standard fares in Shekels are:

Type	Full fare	Discounted fare
Single ride	₪8	₪4
10-trip	₪47.20	₪29.50
15-trip (students & eligible only)	-	₪59.00
20-trip	₪94.40	₪59.00
Unlimited monthly pass	₪213.00	₪106.50
Student pass (semester)	–	₪582.00 (Semester A) ₪646.00 (Semester B)
Student pass (yearly)	–	₪1,410.00
Source: CityPass, Egged (for the current regional Student pass fares)

Reduced fares are available for senior citizens (men 65+, women 60+), youth (under 18 or who are studying in class XII to the end of the school year), students owned "Student pass" (of other regions in Israel), the blind and those with approval by the Ministry of Welfare. One child under 5 with an adult rides for free. Israeli soldiers travel for free, under a special agreement between the Defense Ministry and the railway's operator, as do uniformed police officers. Fare required for un-collapsible baby carriages between 7–10 am and 3–7 pm and all day Fridays and holiday eves. Collapsible bicycles are permitted at all hours. Muzzled small dogs capable of sitting in a rider's lap or being held are permitted.

=== Ridership ===
Year	Annual Ridership (million passengers)
2015	36.405
2016	37.633
2017	42.457

== Controversy ==
=== Budgetary problems and criticism of operator ===
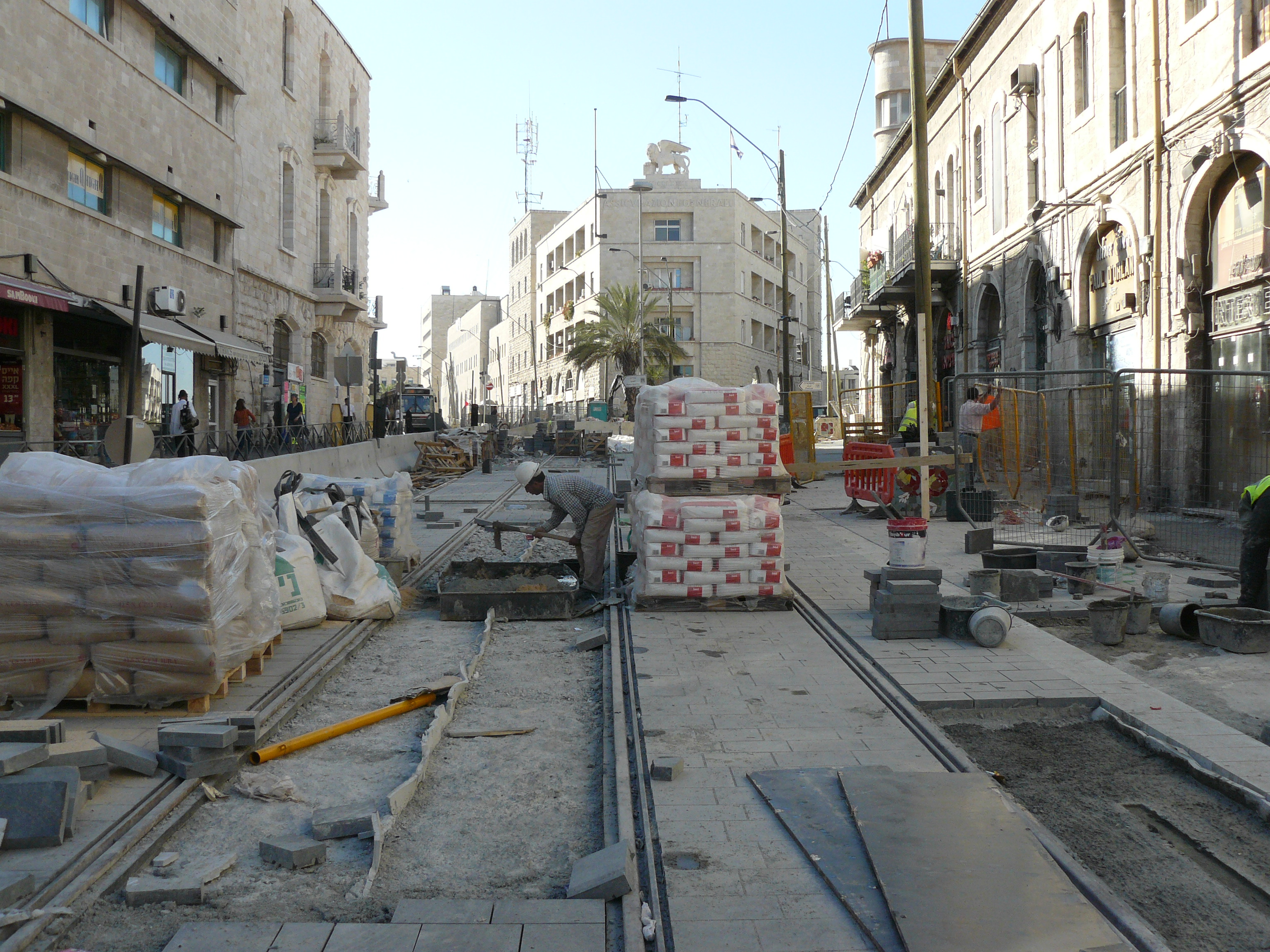
Light rail under construction

The financial management of the project was criticized in May 2008 by State Comptroller Micha Lindenstrauss, who reported a 128% deviation in funds, from an estimated NIS 500 million to NIS 1.14 billion. It was also noted that the government had spent NIS 1.2 billion on the project up to 2007, which pointed to a further deviation. The total cost of the initial line (not including the planned extensions) is estimated at 3.8 billion NIS (approx. US $1.1 billion).

In 2002, the government of Israel signed an agreement with the operator, CityPass, regarding the future operation of the light rail. The agreement was made public in 2012, and generated controversy over a clause where the government pledged to remove competition to the light rail from other public transportation. For instance, there would not be two consecutive bus stops on the same line adjacent to the light rail's route. CityPass stated that before the light rail there had not been competition either, with all public transportation being operated by Egged.

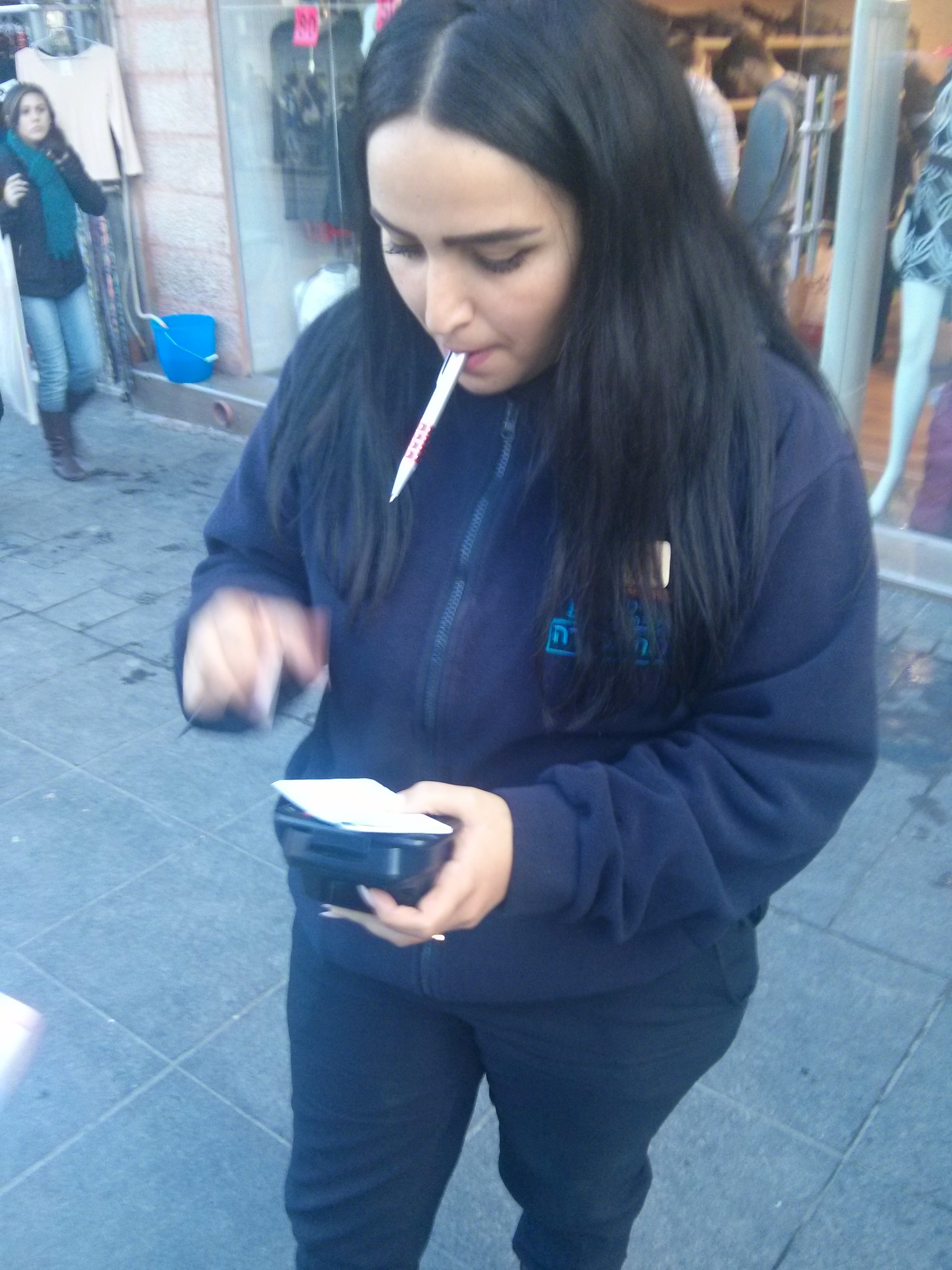
CityPass inspector handing out a fine

Upon buying a ticket, each traveler is required to validate it inside the rail car, and the fine for not doing so (or not buying a ticket) is NIS 186. This has created considerable controversy, and CityPass has been accused of handing out fines indiscriminately in order to raise its income—the company made NIS 2.4 million in the first half year on fines. Litigative and legislative efforts have been made to curb CityPass's power in this regard. An appeal committee will be created to deal with requests to cancel fines.

In 2012 Haviv Rettig Gur criticized CityPass for automatically expiring single ride tickets at the end of the day they were purchased even if they were never used. CityPass does not provide refunds. Rettig Gur wrote "Though I have no proof, I am convinced the expiration policy is intentional." As of 2015 this policy still remains in place. Pinchas M. Orbach identified a technical issue where a customer would not be able to use a legitimate transfer. He wrote "The CityPass Rav-Kav system is unable to properly read a '90 minute transfer from Egged' if a new virtual punch card was purchased on the Rav-Kav in between the original Egged ride and the Light Rail ride." Therefore, even if a passenger was traveling within the 90 minutes allowed for free transfers an inspector using CityPass equipment to read the Rav-Kav would erroneously believe the fare was not paid and issue a fine. CityPass did not respond to the report nor fix the problem.

=== Air pollution and effects on traffic ===
The project was also criticized for increasing air pollution in Jerusalem during construction. However, it was credited with reducing air pollution on Jaffa Road by 80% when the latter was converted to an LRT-only way. In October 2010, residents of Jerusalem filed a NIS 1.2 billion class-action lawsuit against CityPass for the effects of the traffic congestion that the project's construction created, but the Jerusalem District Court ruled that the company could only be sued for air and noise pollution. Nir Barkat, mayor of Jerusalem, was also critical of the congestion. In March 2009, he proposed canceling the project after the first two lines were completed and replacing the rest of the planned rail network with buses. The closure of Jaffa Street has diverted the bus traffic to a nearby street causing a rise in traffic accidents there.

=== Controversy outside Israel ===
The project was criticized because the Red Line route passes through territories Israel has held under occupation since the Six-Day War to service Israeli settlements such as French Hill and Pisgat Ze'ev. In consequence, Dutch bank ASN divested from Veolia Environnement. Both Veolia and Alstom were sued by the Palestine Liberation Organisation and French advocacy group France-Palestine Solidarity Association in the French courts. In 2013, the Versailles Court of Appeals ruled in favor of the French companies, and ordered the Palestinian groups to pay $117,000 in legal costs to the French companies. In the 32-page verdict, the judges ruled that the light rail did not violate international law.

In May 2009 it was reported that the Palestinian Authority had been urging Saudi Arabia through back channels to pressure Alstom and Veolia to abandon the project in return for the multi-billion dollar Haramain High Speed Rail Project and the $25 billion Gulf Railway project. The contract for the Haramain project was eventually awarded to a rival bidder. In November 2009, under the banner of Boycott, Divestment and Sanctions (BDS), Palestinian organizations launched a campaign on the six Gulf Cooperation Council states to withhold lucrative contracts for the Gulf railway project from the two companies unless they comply with demands to withdraw from the Jerusalem project. Veolia decided to sell its interests in the light railway, first to Dan Bus Company in 2009, and later to Egged, as part of a strategy to exit the transportation market. Veolia's interest in the Jerusalem Light Rail, together with its other transport business, was injected in 2011 in new subsidiary Veolia Transdev, jointly owned by Veolia and French financial institution Caisse des Dépôts et Consignations. After poor financial results, Veolia announced in December 2011 that it intended to exit the transport sector altogether and sell its stake in Veolia Transdev.

In a 2009 report, the United Nations Human Rights Council described the Jerusalem Light Rail as infrastructure servicing Israeli settlements. The following year, the Human Rights Council condemned the decision to operate a tramway between West Jerusalem and Pisgat Ze'ev "in violation of international law" and relevant United Nations resolutions. The Council resolution was adopted with 46 votes in favor and 1 against (USA).

In the United Kingdom, an Early Day Motion was tabled in parliament in 2012 against the financing of illegal activity in the West Bank. After referring to the Jerusalem Light Rail, the motion called on the UK government to support EU legislation to ensure "that economic operators aiding and abetting the building, maintenance or servicing of illegal Israeli settlements be excluded from public contracts in the EU".

=== July 2014 unrest ===
In July 2014, Arab rioters caused substantial damage to three stations in Arab neighborhoods as well as other system infrastructure, and left graffiti with "Death to the Jews" and other slogans. Rioting and incessant "rock attacks" inflicted on trains in the Beit Hanina and Shuafat areas have made the train route subject to closures restricting passengers to stations south of Givat HaMivtar. Damage to trains caused two-thirds of CityPass's fleet to be taken offline in an ongoing basis through October 2014.

== Archaeological findings ==
While tracks for the light rail were being laid in Shuafat, the remains of an ancient Roman–Jewish settlement were discovered. The settlement was described as a "sophisticated community impeccably planned by the Roman authorities, with orderly rows of houses and two fine public bathhouses to the north". The findings are said be the first indication of active Jewish settlement in the Jerusalem area after the city fell in 70 CE.

== See also ==
- Carmelit
- Tel Aviv Light Rail
- List of tram and light rail transit systems
