= Red Line (Jerusalem Light Rail) =

Light rail line in Jerusalem

L1 (Jerusalem Light Rail) הרכבת הקלה בירושלים

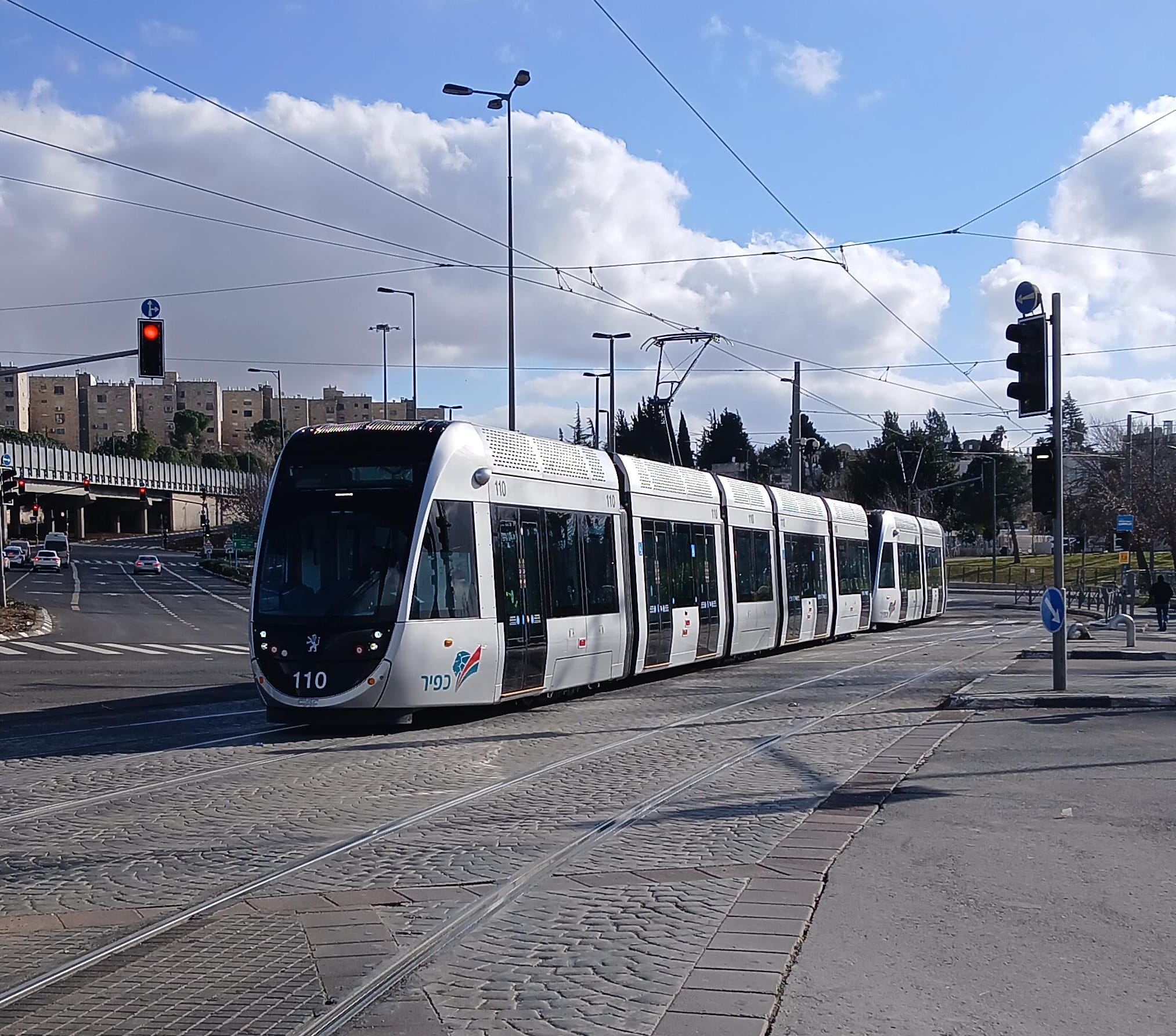
- Red Line train CAF Urbos 100 in the French Hill neighbourhood.

Overview
- Status: Opened
- Owner: Cfir
- Locale: Jerusalem
- Termini: Neve Yaakov; Hadassah Ein Kerem
- Stations: 35
- Website: www.cfir.co.il

Service
- Type: Light rail
- System: Jerusalem Light Rail
- Operator: Cfir
- Depot: French Hill depot
- Rolling stock: 23 of Alstom Citadis 302 CAF Urbos 100
- Daily ridership: 130,000 (2013)

History
- Opened: August 19, 2011 (free trial service); December 1, 2011 (full revenue service); March 2025 (extensions to Neve Yaakov to Hadassah Ein Kerem)

Technical
- Line length: 22.5 km (14.0 mi)
- Num of tracks: 2
- Track gauge: 1,435 mm (4 ft 8 1/2 in) standard gauge
- Electrification: 750 V DC OHLE
- Operating speed: 50 km/h (31 mph) maximum

L1 (or Red Line) is the first section in operation of the light rail system in Jerusalem, known as the Jerusalem Light Rail. It became fully operational on December 1, 2011. The original line was 13.9 kilometers (8.6 mi) long with 23 stops. Extensions to the Red Line to the north of Neve Yaakov and to Hadassah Ein Kerem Hospital to the southwest were completed in February 2025 extending the line's length to 22.5 km (14.0 mi).

With a total estimated cost for the initial section of the line of 3.8 billion NIS (approx. US $1.1 billion), the project was criticized for budget overruns, for its route serving east Jerusalem and for contributing to air and noise pollution during construction.

== Stations ==
List of Jerusalem Light Rail Red Line stations
Station	Street	Location	Neighborhood
Hadassah Ein Kerem הדסה עין כרם	Kalman Yaakov Man Street		Ein Kerem Medical Center
Medical School בית הספר לרפואה	Kalman Yaakov Man Street	Near the entrance of the Hebrew University Ein Kerem Campus.	Ein Kerem Medical Center
Ora Junction צומת אורה	Henrietta Szold Street	At the end of Henrietta Szold Street and near the entrance of the moshav Ora.	Kiryat Menahem
Kiryat Menahem קרית מנחם	Henrietta Szold Street		Kiryat Menahem
Henrietta Szold–East הנרייטה סולד – מזרח	Henrietta Szold Street		Kiryat Menahem
HaMifletzet Playground גן המפלצת	Arthur Hantke Street	Border between Arthur Hantke Street and Henrietta Szold street.	Kiryat HaYovel
Kiryat HaYovel–West קרית היובל – מערב	Arthur Hantke Street		Kiryat HaYovel
Shmaryahu Levin שמריהו לוין	Arthur Hantke Street		Kiryat HaYovel
Mount Herzl הר הרצל	Herzl Boulevard	Corner of HaPisga Street	Bayit VeGan
Yefeh Nof יפה נוף	Herzl Boulevard	Corner of Shmuel Bait Street	Beit HaKerem
Denia Square כיכר דניה	Herzl Boulevard	Corner of HaArazim Street at Denia Square	Beit HaKerem
He-Haluts החלוץ	Herzl Boulevard	Corner of HeHaluts Street	Beit HaKerem
Kiryat Moshe קריית משה	Herzl Boulevard	Corner of HaRav Zvi Yehuda Street	Kiryat Moshe
Central Station התחנה המרכזית	Jaffa Road	Located between the Central Bus Station and Navon railway station	Romema
Ha-Turim הטורים	Jaffa Road	Near Nordau Street	Mahane Yehuda
Mahane Yehuda מחנה יהודה	Jaffa Road	Near Mahane Yehuda Market	Mahane Yehuda
Ha-Davidka ה"דוידקה"	Jaffa Road	Corner of Street of the Prophets at Davidka Square	City Center
Jaffa–Center יפו – מרכז	Jaffa Road	Corner of King George and Straus Streets	City Center
City Hall העיריה	Jaffa Road	Near Safra Square	City Center
Damascus Gate שער שכם	Heil HaHandassa Street	Corner of Sultan Suleiman Street	City Center
Shivtei Israel שבטי ישראל	Heil HaHandassa Street	Corner of Shivtei Israel Street	Beit Yisrael
Shim'on Ha-Tsadik שמעון הצדיק	Haim Bar Lev Boulevard	Corner of Shimon HaTsadik Street	Sheikh Jarrah
Ammunition Hill גבעת התחמושת	Haim Bar Lev Boulevard	Corner of Levi Eshkol Boulevard	French Hill
Giv'at Ha-Mivtar גבעת המיבתר	Shuafat Road	Corner of Sheshet HaYamim Street	Givat HaMivtar, French Hill
Es-Sahl א-סהל	Shuafat Road	Corner of Umm Al-Amed Street	Shuafat
Shu'afat שועפאט	Shuafat Road	Corner of Ben Rabah Street	Shuafat
Beit 'Hanina בית חנינא	Yekutiel Adam Street	Corner of Beit Hanina Street	Beit Hanina
Yekuti'el Adam יקותיאל אדם	Yekutiel Adam Street	Corner of Moshe Dayan Boulevard	Pisgat Ze'ev
Pisgat Ze'ev Center פסגת זאב מרכז	Moshe Dayan Boulevard	Near Hapisga Mall	Pisgat Ze'ev
Sayeret Dukhifat סיירת דוכיפת	Moshe Dayan Boulevard	Corner of Sayeret Dukhifat Street	Pisgat Ze'ev
'Heil Ha-Avir חיל האויר	Moshe Dayan Boulevard	Corner of Heil HaAvir Street	Pisgat Ze'ev
Moshe Dayan משה דיין	Moshe Dayan Boulevard		Pisgat Ze'ev
Mazal Kashat מזל קשת	Moshe Dayan Boulevard	Corner of Moshe Dayan Boulevard and Neve Yaakov Boulevard	Pisgat Ze'ev
Itzhak Tavenkin יצחק טבנקין	Neve Yaakov Boulevard		Pisgat Ze'ev
Neve Yaakov נווה יעקב	Neve Yaakov Boulevard		Neve Yaakov

== Extensions ==
Map of the Jerusalem Light Rail

Initial extensions to the Red Line were planned to the neighborhoods of Neve Yaakov in Northeast Jerusalem and Ein Karem (near Hadassah Hospital) in the Southwest. Former mayor Uri Lupolianski stated that they would be completed at the same time as the rest of the line. In 2008, French company Egis Rail won an 11.9 million Euro contract to carry out some of the design work. However, in March 2009, CityPass turned down implementing the project. In May 2010, the Jerusalem Municipality announced that the extensions would be built by the state authorities rather than a private company. The extension to Hadassah Hospital from Mount Herzl was particularly challenging and involved a complex path with complicated bridging works. The line's terminal station next to Hadassah's inpatient building was built during the construction of the inpatient building in order not to disrupt hospital operations later after the new building was completed. At one point, branches to the Red Line were planned that would create a "campus line" connecting the Mount Scopus and Givat Ram campuses of the Hebrew University, but it was decided that this function will be accomplished by the Green Line, whose first section opened in August 2026.

The Red Line extension of the Jerusalem Light Rail, intended to reach Hadassah Hospital and Neve Yaakov, has faced several delays. Initially set for completion in July 2023, the project’s timeline has been extended, with the new expected start of operations being no earlier than November 2024. The delay has been attributed to budgetary issues, infrastructure challenges, and a shortage of manpower. Infrastructure works are completed in certain segments, with others still under construction.

Eventually, the extensions of the Red Line to Neve Yaakov and Hadassah Ein Kerem opened on February 25, 2025, and became operational on February 27, 2025. On March 9, the opening ceremony for the extension was conducted by the Prime Minister, Benjamin Netanyahu and the Mayor of Jerusalem, Moshe Lion.

== Connections ==
The first section of the Green Line, with 13 stations running 7 kilometres (4.3 mi) between Malha and HaTurim, opened on August 21, 2026, with connections to the Red Line at the HaTurim station and the Jerusalem central bus station / Jerusalem–Yitzhak Navon railway station.

== See also ==
- Tel Aviv Light Rail
- Jerusalem Light Rail
