= Gazelle Valley =

Park in Jerusalem, Israel

Coordinates: 31°45′34″N 35°11′42″E

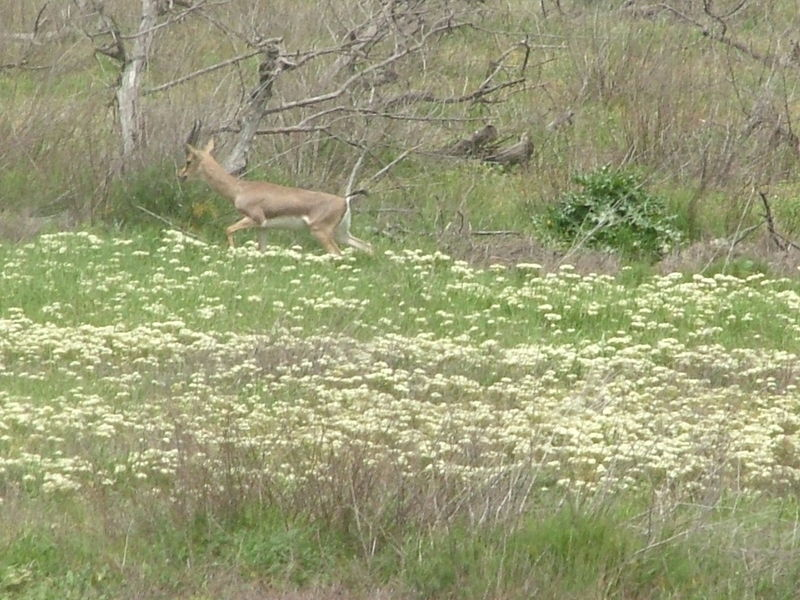
Gazelle in the Pri Har Valley

Gazelle Valley (Hebrew: עמק הצבאים, translit: Emek Hatzva'im), previously known as the Pri Har Valley, is an open space of 260 dunams (64.25 acres) in the heart of Jerusalem, Israel, on the edge of the Givat Mordechai neighborhood, opposite the busy Patt Intersection.

== History ==
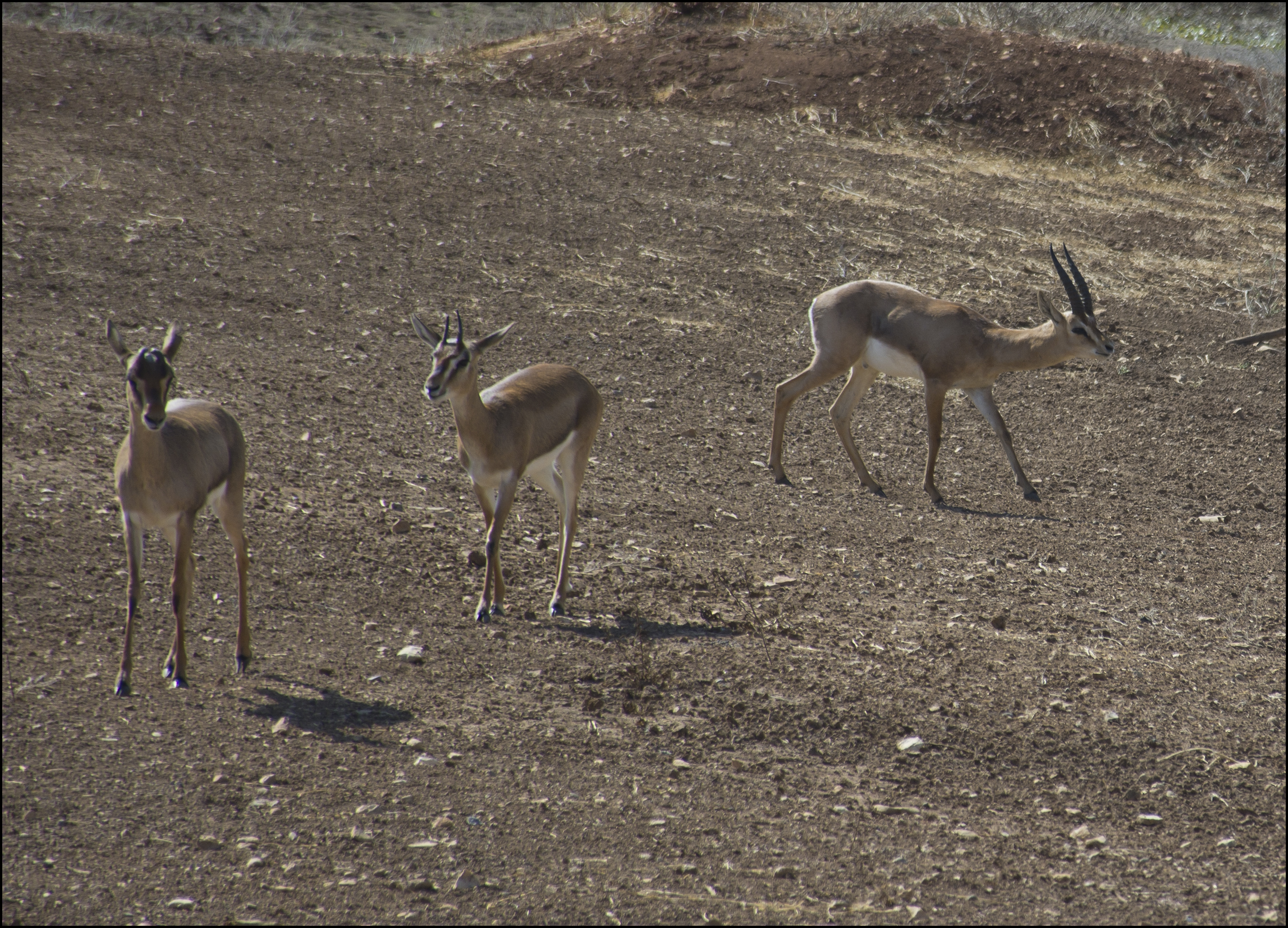
Gazelles in Jerusalem, 2016

Gazelle Valley is named for a herd of about 55 gazelles of the subspecies Gazella gazella gazella that live in this area, bounded by urban development. Real estate developers have sought building rights in the area, but the Society for the Protection of Nature in Israel (SPNI) and local activists have fought to preserve the natural surroundings. After lengthy court battles, the Jerusalem Municipality has drawn up plans to turn the area into a public park and nature reserve. The Jerusalem Development Authority pledged ₪8 million in funding toward the park.

In January 2013, work began on the park, which is described as Israel’s first urban nature reserve, which opened in March 2015.

The Gazelle Valley has become one of the most accessible places to see a local wildlife in their natural environment. Several endangered species beyond Gazelles live in the Gazelle Valley. A small pond in the middle of the valley contributes to this biodiversity.

== See also ==
- Wildlife in Israel
- Tourism in Israel
- Wildlife corridor
