= Pat, Jerusalem =

Neighborhood in southwestern Jerusalem

Pat פת
- Neighborhood
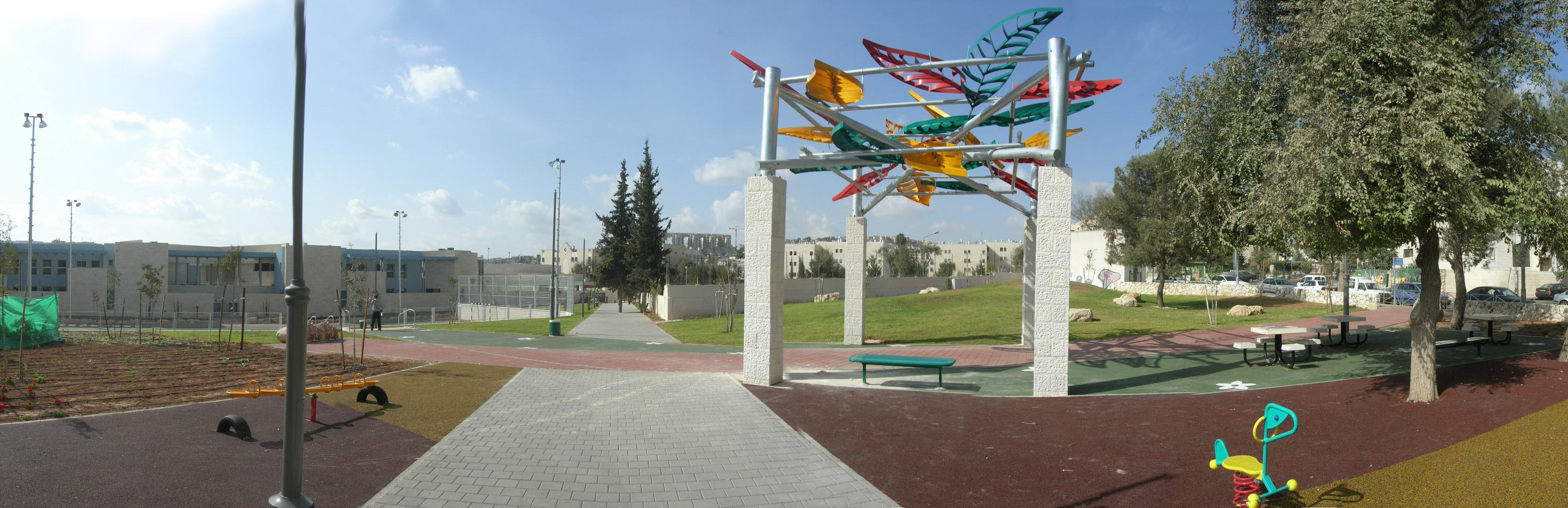
- Goren-Goldstein park and the bilingual school (left) in Pat, 2007

- Location in Jerusalem
- City: Jerusalem
- Established: 1950s

Pat is a neighborhood in southwestern Jerusalem, located between Katamon (Gonen) in the north and Beit Safafa in the south.

== History ==
The Pat neighborhood is named for Yaacov Pat, a commander of the Haganah.

Pat was the last of the Katamonim neighborhoods built in the 1950s to provide housing for residents of the Maabara transit camps and other socio-economically weak populations. The main thoroughfare is Yaacov Pat Street, which separates it from Katamon Het.

In the 1990s, under the auspices of "Project Renewal," apartment blocks in Pat were expanded and faced with Jerusalem stone. The construction of Malha Mall, Teddy Stadium and the Jerusalem Railway Station, which are all near Pat, along with the development of the Talpiot industrial zone and the construction of the Begin Expressway, have increased property values.

== Education and culture ==
Institutions include a religious high school – ORT Spanian, Pat community center and a branch of Mishmar HaEzrahi. Also located in Pat is the WIZO Institute, a Tipat Halav mother-and-child station, and the Nishmat Torah institute for women.

In 1981, the Jerusalem Foundation established a park and sports center on an area of 45 dunams that includes a Jerusalem pine grove, a playground and sports facilities. In 2005-2007, the park was renovated and renamed the Mama Betty Park and Sports Center.

In 2007, the Max Rayne School, a bilingual Hebrew–Arabic school was founded in Pat, open to all Jewish and Arab children in Jerusalem.

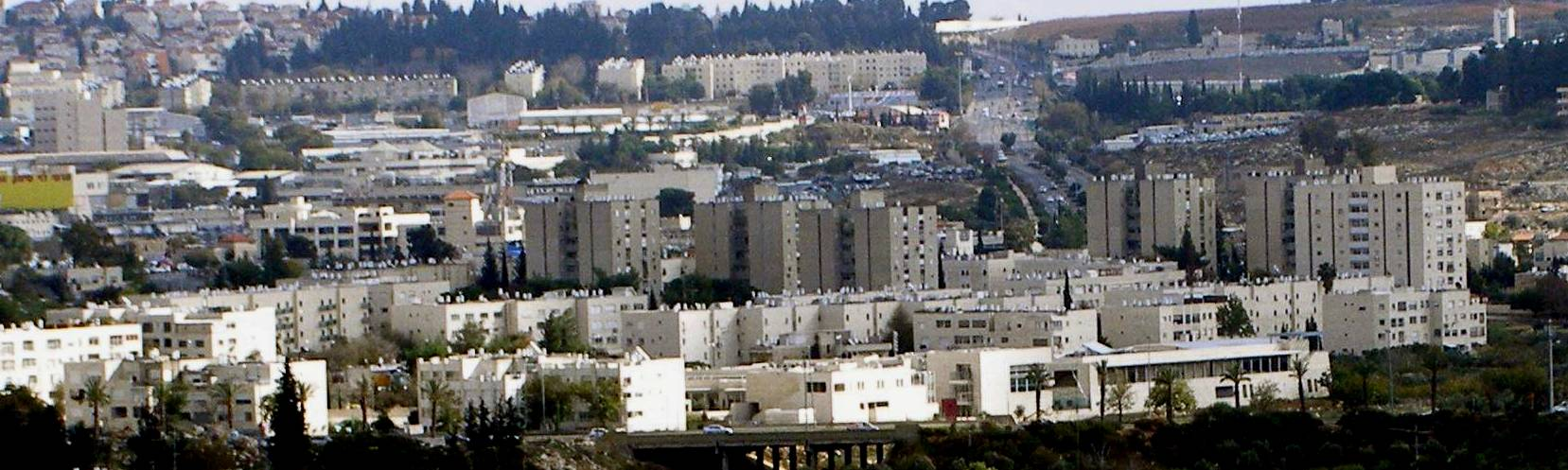
Pat panorama

== Tzomet Pat ==
Tzomet Pat (Pat Junction) is located approximately 1 kilometre (0.62 mi) west of the neighbourhood, at the end of Yaakov Pat Street, which separates it from the Katamon Hei neighbourhood. The intersection connects to Herzog Street and serves as a major junction in southern Jerusalem, hosting several businesses, shops, and restaurants. A grade separation project was carried out at the intersection for the light rail, and tracks have been installed.

In February 2020, the District Planning and Building Committee approved a plan for a mixed-use complex at the junction, integrating residential, commercial, and public spaces. The project includes 296 residential units distributed across two 30-story towers and two 9-story buildings, along with 3,500 square metres (38,000 sq ft) for commercial and office use and 3,700 square metres (40,000 sq ft) for public facilities.
