= Jerusalem central bus station =

Bus station in Jerusalem, Israel

Coordinates: 31.789°N 35.203°E

The Jerusalem Central Bus Station (Hebrew: התחנה המרכזית של ירושלים, HaTahanah HaMerkazit Shel Yerushalayim, Arabic: محطة الحافلات المركزية) is the main bus depot in Jerusalem. Located on Jaffa Road near the entrance to the city, it serves Egged, Superbus and Dan intercity bus routes. City buses and light rail trains pick up and discharge passengers across the street on Jaffa Road and on Zalman Shazar Boulevard, which can be accessed via an underground pedestrian passageway. The entrance to Israel Railways' underground Navon Railway Station is located across the light rail stop in front of the station.

== History ==
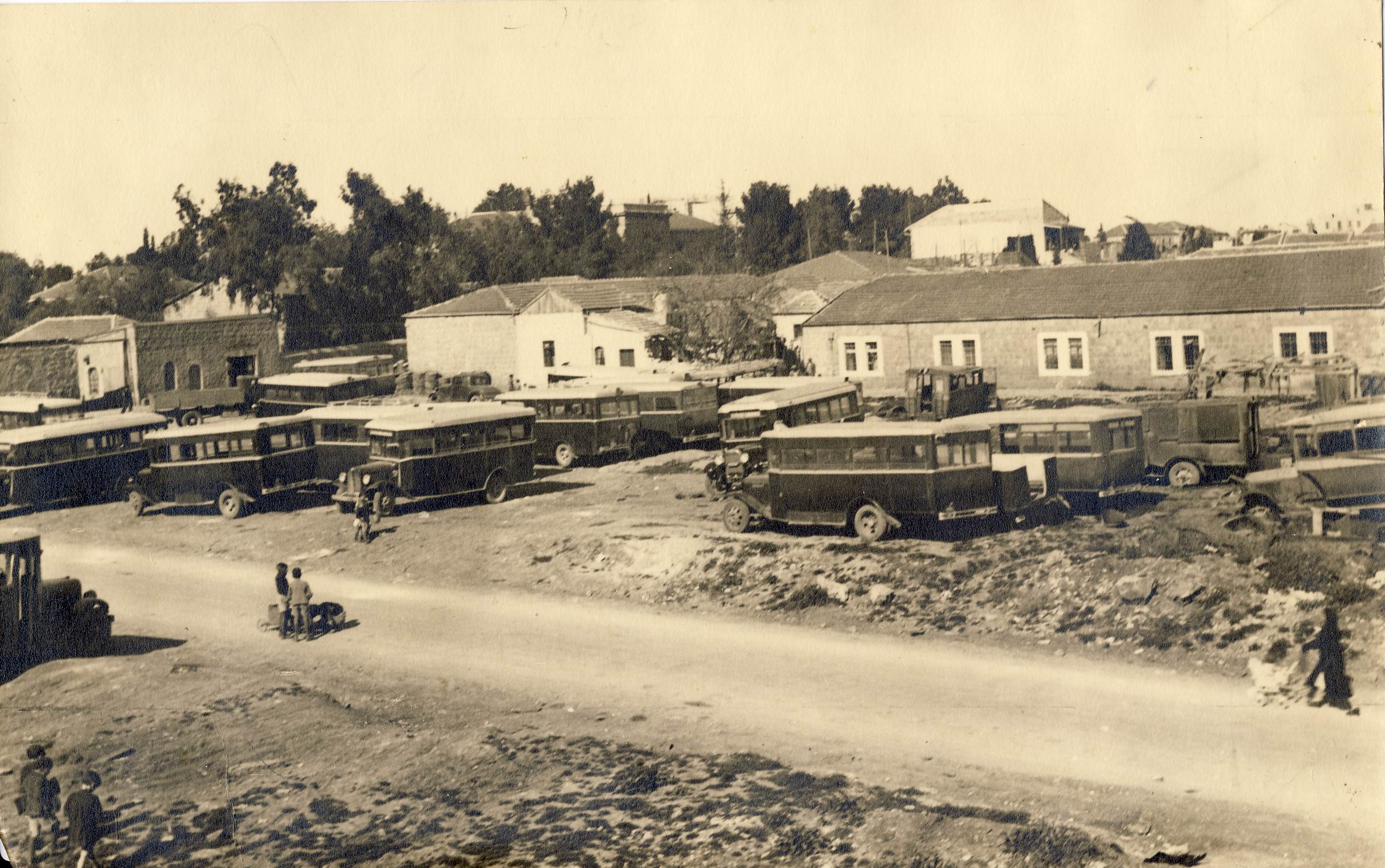
Hamekasher buses park outside Sha'arei Yerushalayim neighborhood on Jaffa Road in the 1930s

Starting in 1932, the main bus station was located in the heart of downtown Jerusalem, on Jaffa Road just east of King George street. The Pillars Building ("Binyan Ha'amudim") currently stands on this site.

In the 1960s a replacement station, designed by Ossip Klarwein, was built further west, at the site of the current station. The old station was a long, single-story building with an open-air bus depot behind it. Passengers embarked and disembarked at curbside on an outdoor platform.

The current Central Bus Station opened in September 2001 on the site of its predecessor. It was commissioned in order to accommodate the increasing flow of bus traffic as well as to implement security protocols for screening incoming and outgoing passengers. During construction of the new bus station, operations were moved to a temporary station, several blocks east on Jaffa Road, adjacent to the later-to-be-built HaTurim light rail stop.

== Interior design ==
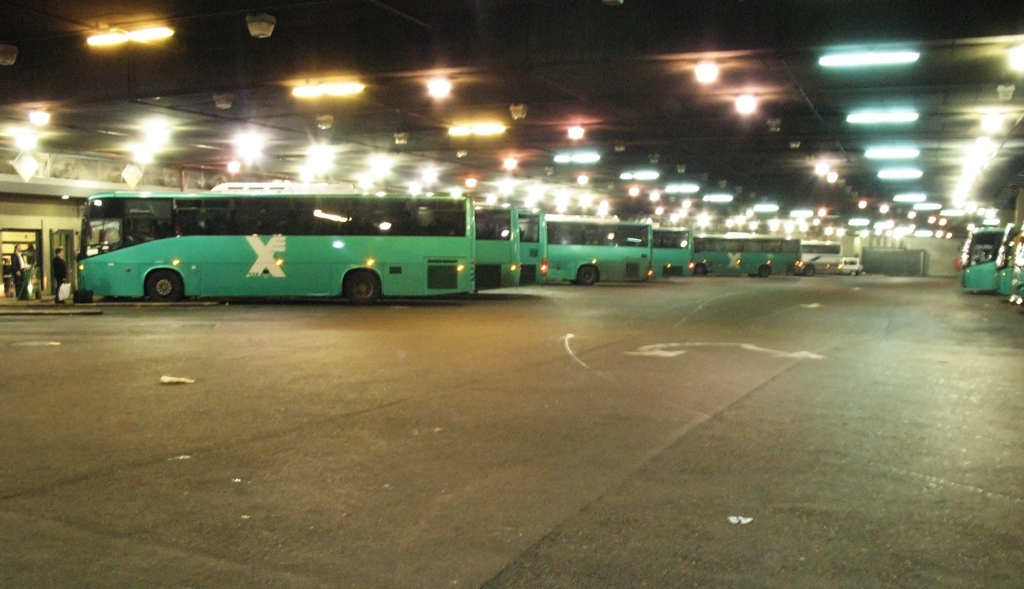
Interior of the departures garage on the third floor

The new Central Bus Station has two levels of underground parking, three main levels, and five upper floors of office space. The first main level is a shopping concourse and food court. The second main level serves as both a shopping concourse and the arrivals hall for incoming intercity bus passengers. Since the building is constructed on the side of a hill, the first and second main levels both have a ground-level entrance/exit to Jaffa Road. Besides retail stores, the concourse includes bakery outlets, a video game parlor, and free-standing gift sellers.

The third main level serves as the departures hall, with 22 bus platforms. Passengers wait at numbered doors for the bus to pull into its slot in the indoor parking lot, then go through the door into the indoor garage to board. Large digital display boards post upcoming departure times.

While most platforms accommodate more than one bus route, popular routes, such as Jerusalem-Tel Aviv, have their own designated platform and run more frequently.

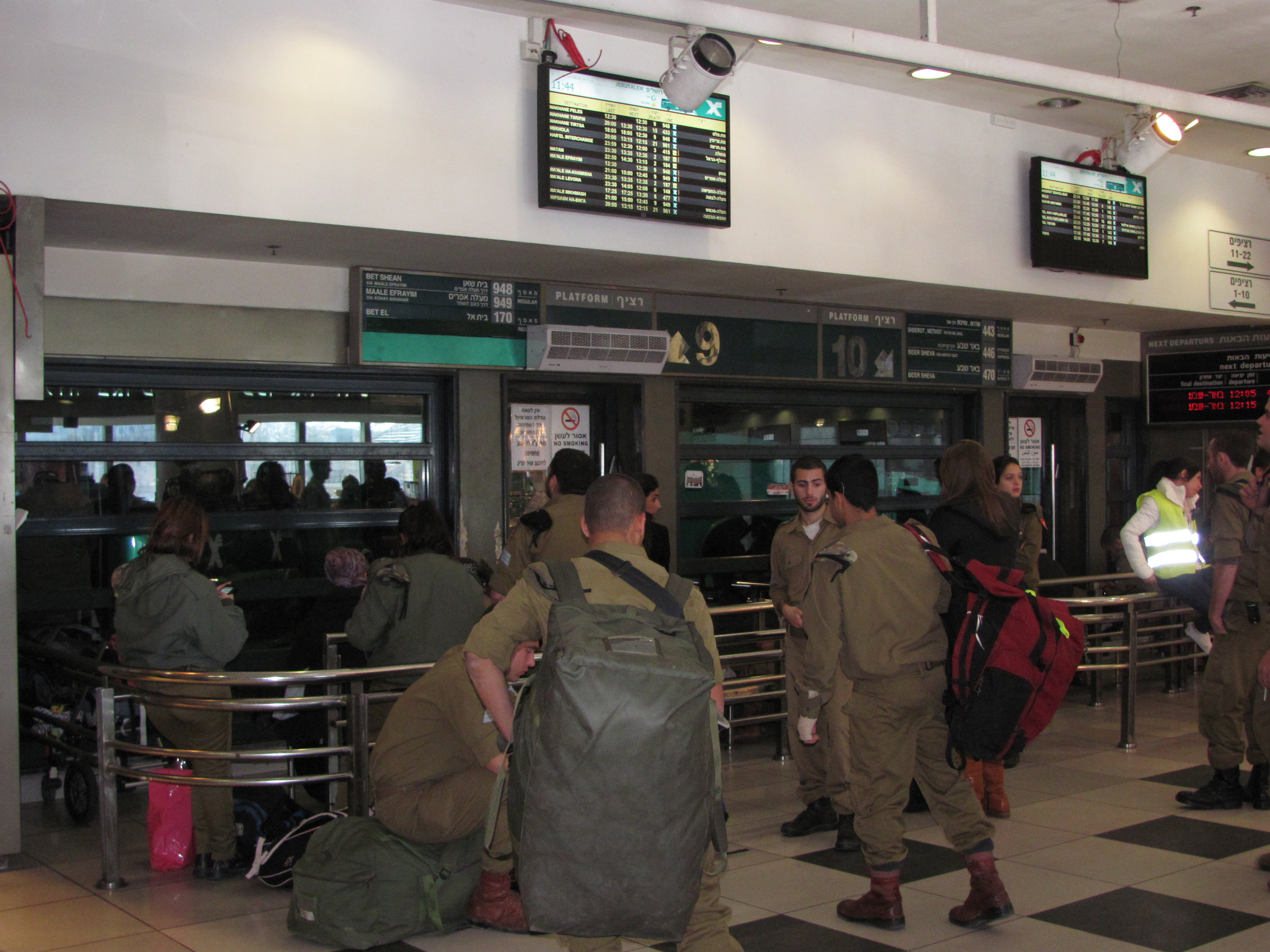
Israeli soldiers wait to board intercity buses at an indoor platform on the third floor.

Passengers and their baggage are screened by security personnel every time they enter the Central Bus Station building. That is, departing passengers must go through security clearance when they enter the building from Jaffa Road and may then board buses without additional security checks. Passengers arriving in Jerusalem are dropped off in the garage on the other side of the building. They may choose to exit out to the street—in which case they do not need to pass through security—or to go into the bus station building—in which case they must go through a security check. People wishing to visit only the shopping concourses must also clear security. As is the case for most commercial security checkpoints in Israel, gun owners are exempt from security searches, it being presumed that anyone who has been vetted by the government to carry a loaded firearm in public has no criminal or terrorist intentions. In addition to building security, Egged has its own team of uniformed security personnel patrolling the indoor bus parking lots.

=== Indoor air pollution ===
In October 2013 the Environmental Protection Ministry of Israel officially declared the indoor garage where passengers board the buses to be "an excessively polluted space and an endangerment to public health". The levels of nitrogen oxide and respirable particulates generated by exhaust were said to be in violation of Israel's Clean Air Law. In 2012 the bus station received a fine of NIS 708,224 for air pollution, which is still being discussed in court, and in September 2011 the Environmental Protection Ministry ordered the management to "completely separate the bus platform and the building's interior due to high pollution levels".

== Train stations ==
The Jerusalem–Yitzhak Navon intercity rail station is located adjacent to the bus station, across Jaffa street. A Jerusalem Light Rail station, as well as the Jaffa street city bus stops, are situated between the bus and train stations.

Preceding station	Jerusalem Light Rail	Following station
Ha-Turim	Red Line	Kiryat Moshe

== Intercity platform list ==
Plat No.	Lines	Destination
1		
2	187, 420	Har Adar, Beit Shemesh
3	415, 416	Beit Shemesh
4	444, 445, 486, 487	Dead Sea and Eilat
5	941, 943, 946, 949	Samaria
6	380, 381, 382, 383, 440	Southern Judea
7	443, 446, 460	Netivot, Be'er Sheva, Kiryat Gat
8	470	Be'er Sheva
9	436, 437	Ashkelon
10	438, 448	Ashdod
11	404, 406, 408, 456,	Holon, Lod, Tzrifin
12	403, 431, 432, 433	Rishon LeZion, Ramla
13	434, 435, 439, 447	Rehovot, Yavne
14	405	Tel Aviv
15	431, 432, 433, 456, 480	Rishon LeZion, Tel Aviv
16	480	Tel Aviv
17	947, 950	Haifa
18	930, 942, 944, 947, 950	Haifa, Netanya, Hadera, Herzliya
19	940, 960	Haifa
20	953, 959, 962, 963	Afula, Tiberias, Kiryat Shmona
21	955, 961, 966, 968	Nof HaGalil, Beit She'an, Katzrin, Karmiel
22	400, 401, 425, 427	Bnei Brak, Petah Tikva
53	277, 402, 407, 417, 426, 492, 494, 952, 982, 996, 997, 999	Different locations around Israel, local lines to suburbs. Mainly lines to the Orthodox sector.
54 – Urban lines	127, 129, 130, 131, 132, 133, 134, 135, 137, 151, 154, 155, 156, 157, 158, 173, 174, 175, 176, 177, 178	Mevaseret Zion, Giv'at Ze'ev, Ma'ale Adumim
54 – Intercity lines	140, 141, 142, 143, 144, 147, 148, 180, 181, 183, 185, 186, 188, 189, 192, 194, 195, 361, 362, 364, 365, 366, 367, 369, 453, 461, 462, 463, 464, 465, 466, 467, 468, 469	Different locations around Israel, local lines to suburbs.

== Haredi buses ==
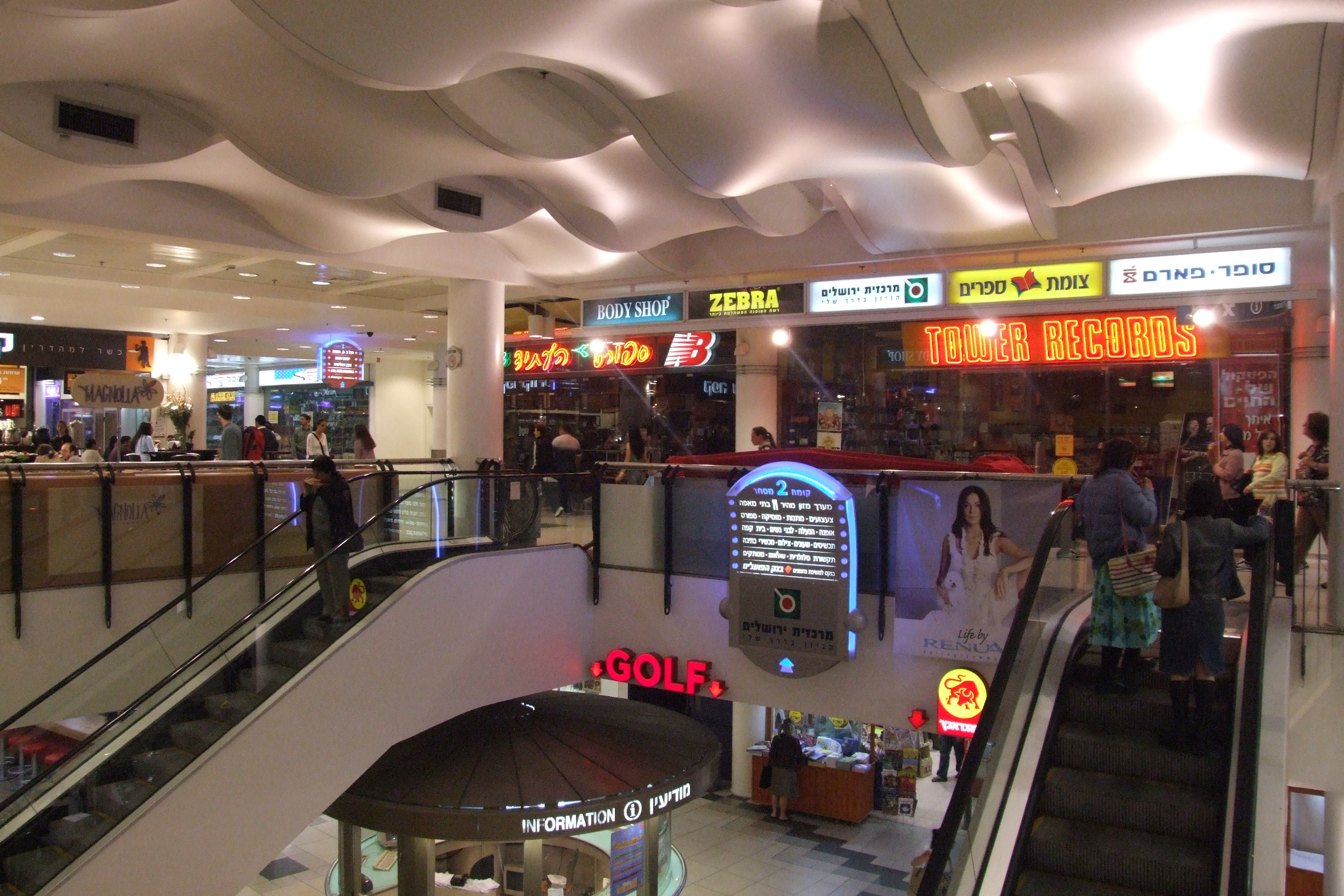
Shopping concourse

The decision to include a shopping concourse within the bus station was criticized by the Haredi community. After Haredi activists petitioned the Ministry of Transportation to allow Egged to open a departure point for buses traveling to Haredi destinations that would board outside the Central Bus Station, Egged opened a special platform where passengers boarding its Route 400 to Bnei Brak sit in relative privacy. In addition, the bus company agreed to launch a "mehadrin" Route 402 between Jerusalem and Bnei Brak. This route departs from Egged's city bus terminus at Har Hotzvim in northern Jerusalem, accommodating Haredi riders who wish to avoid the Central Bus Station altogether. The Har Hotzvim terminus has expanded to include "mehadrin" bus departures to other Haredi destinations such as Safed, Ashdod, Haifa, Arad, Kiryat Ata and more.

At one point, the "mehadrin" lines were gender segregated, with men sitting in the front rows and women in the back rows. In a 2011 ruling, the Israeli High Court of Justice stated the unlawfulness of gender segregation and abolished the "mehadrin" public buses. However, the court rule allowed the continuation of the gender segregation in public buses on a voluntary basis for a one-year experimental period. The system of separate lines terminating at Har Hotzvim remains unchanged.

== Kosher McDonald's controversy ==
A further controversy followed the opening of a McDonald's franchise in the food court. Most McDonald's restaurants, including the one in the Jerusalem city center, did not have kashrut certification from the rabbinate. Although this McDonald's franchise was in the process of applying for a kashrut certificate, and even completed its construction accordingly, the rabbinate conditioned its certification on McDonald's making its other outlets in the city kosher. When McDonald's decided to open a kosher branch but without a certificate, Haredi activists threatened a boycott. The Natzba real-estate firm which owns the bus station canceled McDonald's contract. McDonald's took it to court and won; Natzba was forced to pay it 100,000 shekels in trial expenses. McDonald's opened its franchise in the Central Bus Station, following halachic obligations, but without rabbinical supervision. The Haredi boycott never materialized.

In January 2010, McDonald's reopened with a kosher certificate from the Jerusalem rabbinate, after the company agreed to make changes to satisfy the rabbis. The signs are blue, instead of the traditional red, with "kosher" written in English and Hebrew in big letters. The disposable cartons, bags, wraps, and place mats, are also blue and bear no golden arches, and the staff wear special uniforms.

== See also ==
- Tel Aviv Central Bus Station
- List of Egged bus routes in Israel
