= Neve Yaakov =

Israeli settlement in East Jerusalem

Coordinates: 31°50′28″N 35°14′33″E

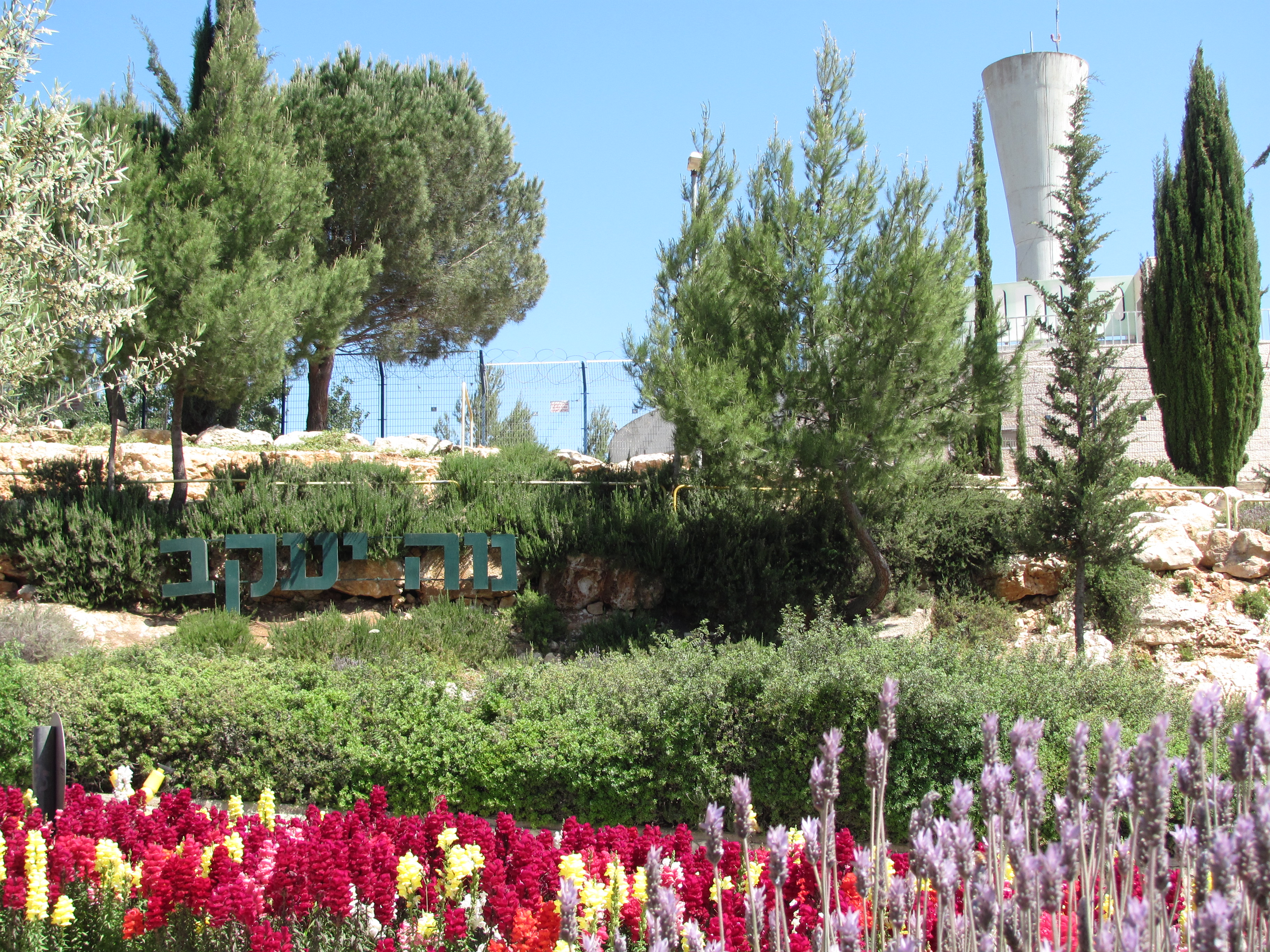
Entrance to Neve Yaakov

Neve Yaakov (Hebrew: נווה יעקב; also Neve Ya'aqov, lit. Jacob's Oasis) is an Israeli settlement in East Jerusalem, part of the Israeli-occupied territories, north of the settlement of Pisgat Ze'ev and south of the Palestinian locality of al-Ram. Established in 1924 during the period of the British Mandate, it was depopulated during the 1948 Arab–Israeli War. The area was captured by Israel in the Six-Day War and a new neighborhood was built nearby, at which time international opposition to its legitimacy began. The international community considers Israeli settlements in East Jerusalem illegal under international law, but the Israeli government disputes this, defining it as a neighborhood within the jurisdiction of the Jerusalem Municipality, which provides all services. The population of Neve Yaakov is 23,300. Neve Yaakov is one of the Ring Settlements of East Jerusalem. The settlement is also the location of the IDF's Central Command for the West Bank, Jerusalem, Sharon, Gush Dan and Shephelah.

== History ==
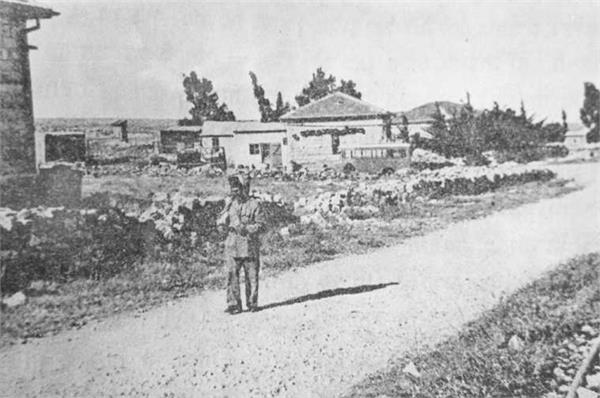
Neve Yaakov 1938

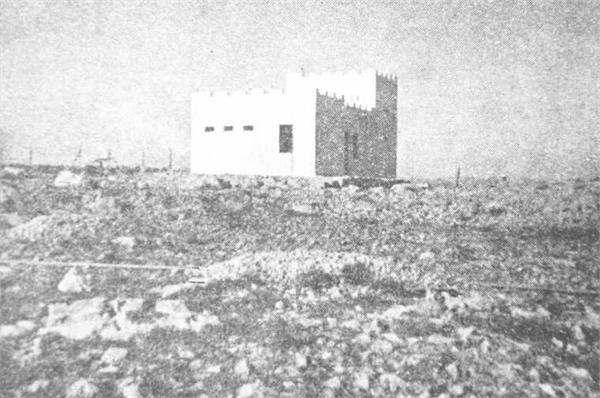
Neve Yaakov 1938

Neve Yaakov was established in 1924 on a 65 dunams (0.065 km^{2}; 0.025 sq mi) parcel of land purchased from Arabs from nearby Beit Hanina by members of the American Mizrachi movement. HaKfar HaIvri Neve Yaakov (The Jewish Village of Neve Yaakov) was named for the leader of the movement, Rabbi Yitzchak Yaacov Reines (1839–1915). It was an hour's walk to the Old City, where most Jews of Jerusalem lived at the time. Until they were abandoned in 1948, Neve Yaakov and Atarot were the only Jewish settlements north of the Old City.

The first houses were ready for occupancy in the summer of 1925. The village's rav, Rabbi Yitzchak Avigdor Orenstein, ruled that new homeowners could move into their homes even during The Nine Days, saying that the mitzvah of settling the Land of Israel overrode the laws of the mourning period. Rabbi Orenstein himself moved into his new house during The Nine Days, while village administrator Dov Brinker moved his furniture and belongings into his new house on Tisha B'Av itself.

The village, home to 150 families, suffered from financial problems and lack of a regular water supply. After years of hauling water in buckets from a well six kilometers away, the village received a government water pipeline in 1935. Electricity was hooked up in 1939.

After years of peaceful co-existence with the surrounding Arab villagers, from whom they purchased vegetables, fruit and eggs, the inhabitants of Neve Yaakov were attacked during the 1929 Palestine riots, and many families returned to the Old City. According to a census conducted in 1931 by the British Mandate authorities, Neve Yaakov had a population of 101 inhabitants, in 20 houses. In the course of the 1936–39 Arab revolt in Palestine, shots were heard from the Arab side almost every night. The British Mandate government supplied a cache of arms to defend Neve Yaakov, and members of the Zionist Haganah pre-state army moved in to guard the village and its water pipeline.

During the peaceful years from 1940 to 1947, the village operated a school that accepted students from all over the country. Children's summer camps and convalescent facilities were opened, taking advantage of the rural atmosphere and fresh air. Veteran Jerusalem residents remember hiking to Neve Yaakov to buy fresh milk from dairy farmers.

During the last months of the British Mandate, snipers in Neve Yaakov shot at traffic on the Jerusalem/Ramallah road. In March 1948 the British Army introduced convoys to protect travellers.

When the Jordanian Arab Legion advanced toward Jerusalem from the north during the 1948 Arab–Israeli War, Neve Yaakov and Atarot were abandoned in the wake of advance warning that they were about to be attacked. Atarot was abandoned on May 17, 1948. The region was occupied by the Jordanians until the 1967 Six-Day War, when Israel captured the Old City and its surroundings.

On 27 January 2023, a Palestinian assailant killed seven Israelis in a shooting in Neve Yaakov.

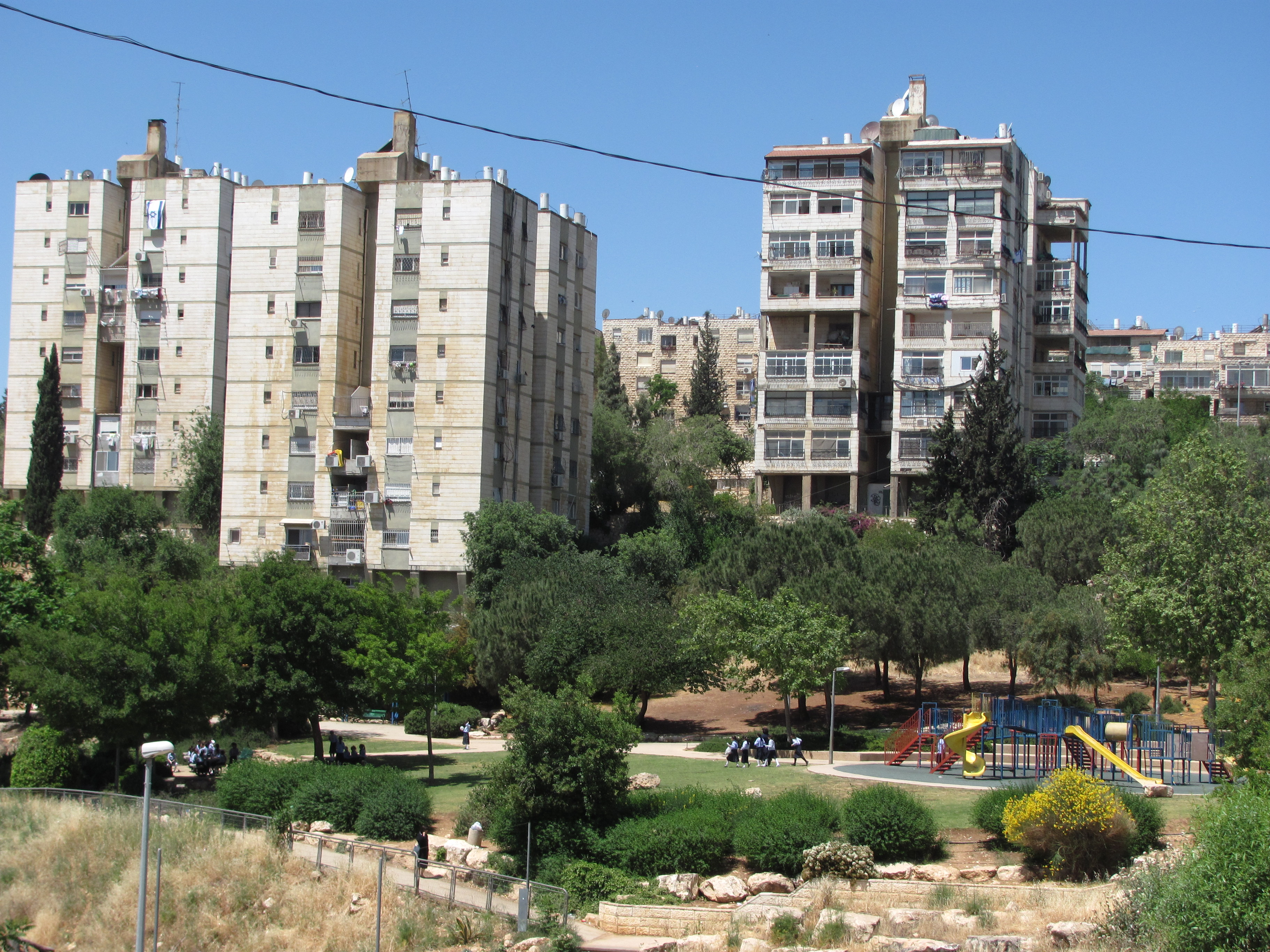
Petrie Park in Neve Yaakov

According to ARIJ, Israel has confiscated land from three nearby Palestinian communities in order to re-establish Neve Yaakov:

- 551 dunams from Beit Hanina,
- 385 dunams from Hizma,
- 315 dunums from Al-Ram.

In August 1970 3,500 acres of privately owned and titled Palestinian land was confiscated for "public purposes". On this land, four residential colonies were established including Neve Yaakov with 4,000 apartments. In 1972, a new Israeli neighborhood was constructed on the site of the original village, with 4,900 apartments in high-rise buildings. The new neighborhood was populated by Jewish immigrants from Bukhara, Georgia, Latin America, North Africa, France and Iran. In the 1990s, when large waves of Russian and Ethiopian Jews came to Israel, many settled in Neve Yaakov.

In October 1971, Rabbi Meir Kahane presented the Minister of Immigrant Absorption, Natan Peled, a memo detailing plans for a community for American Jews in Neve Yaakov.

== Demography ==
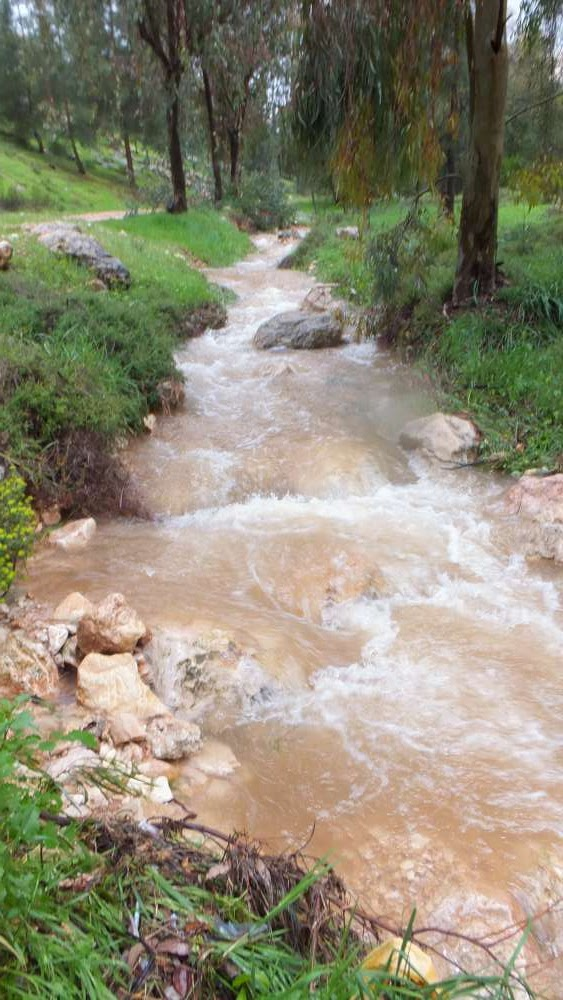
Neve Yaakov forest

In 1982, Kiryat Kaminetz, a housing development on the eastern edge of Neve Yaakov named for the Jewish community of Kamenets, Poland destroyed in the Holocaust, was built on the eastern side of the existing neighborhood. Several hundred apartments were populated by young, Haredi Jewish families, many of them from English-speaking countries. In 1992, 700 new apartments were added to Kiryat Kaminetz on the eastern slope of the mountain; this new neighborhood is also known as Neve Yaakov Mizrach (Neve Yaakov East). The latter has a high concentration of Hasidic and Sephardic Haredi families, with a variety of schools and synagogues serving each population.

The Haredi character of the neighborhood has expanded further since 2004 with an influx of newlywed couples, both Israeli-born and immigrants from English-speaking countries, to the older sections of Neve Yaakov. This new trend has been characterized by calling the older section the Mitchared (literally, "Haredization"). In 2009 the Haredi presence in Neve Yaakov was estimated at 900 families.

Figures as of January 2016 from the Jerusalem Municipality showed a total population of 24,225, of which nearly half are under the age of 21. Seventy-six percent of the population is under the age of 40. Neve Yaakov is noted as having the largest kindergarten enrollment in the city. The 2016 figures cite 91 percent as being enrolled in Haredi kindergartens. In the elementary school system, 86 percent of children are enrolled in Haredi schools.

== Education ==
Neve Yaakov Mizrach is home to two yeshivas catering to American students: Yeshivas Bais Yisroel and Yeshivas Lev Aryeh.

== See also ==
- 2023 East Jerusalem synagogue shooting

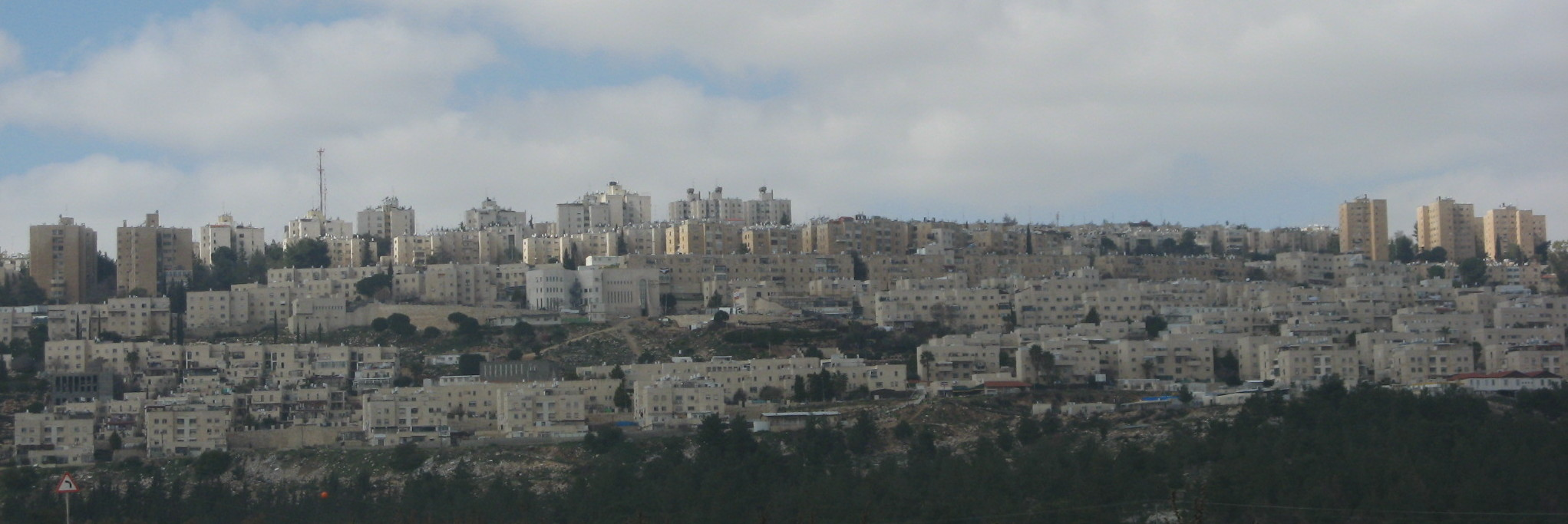
View of Neve Yaakov from the east
