= Efrat (name) =

Efrat is both an Israeli given name and surname.

== Given name ==
- Efrat Abramov (born 1980), an Israeli TV anchor and screenwriter
- Efrat Dor (born 1983), Israeli actress
- Efrat Gosh (born 1983), an Israeli singer-songwriter
- Efrat Lifshitz (born 1956), Israeli chemist
- Efrat Mishori (born 1964), Israeli poet, essayist, performance artist, and filmmaker
- Efrat Natan (born 1947), Israeli artist
- Efrat Peled (born 1974), Israeli chairman and CEO of Arison Investments
- Efrat Rayten (born 1972), Israeli actress, lawyer, and politician
- Efrat Shvily (born 1955), Israeli artist
- Efrat Tilma (born 1947), Israeli transgender activist
- Efrat Ungar (1971–1996), Israeli illustrator and writer of children's literature

== Surname ==
- Aharon Efrat (1911–1989), Israeli politician
- Benni Efrat (born 1936), Israeli artist
- Daniel Efrat (born 1982), Israeli actor, director, and translator
- Gilad Efrat (born 1969), Israeli painter and professor
- Ovad Efrat, Israeli musician
- Roy Efrat (born 1979), Israeli-German visual artist
- Yona Efrat (1925–1993), Israeli military officer

== See also ==
- Efrat (disambiguation)
