= Roi Kuper =

Israeli art photographer (born 1956)

Roi Kuper רועי קופר
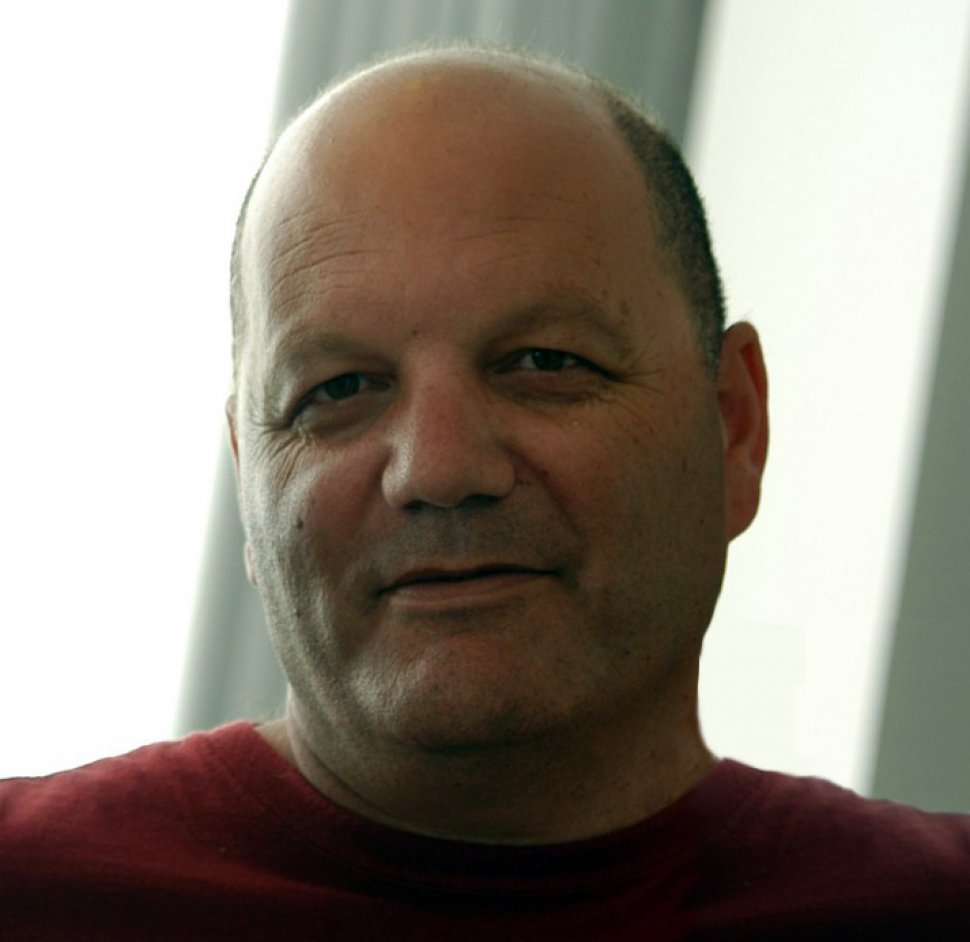
- Kuper in 2010
- Born: 1956 (age 69–70)
- Known for: Photography
- Awards: Gerard Levy Prize (1995); Constantiner Photography Award (2006); Enrique Kavlin Photography Prize (2004–2005)
- Website: https://www.roikuper.com/

Roi Kuper (Hebrew: רועי קופר; born 1956) is a leading Israeli art photographer and a lecturer at the Shenkar College of Engineering and Design. His works have been presented in solo exhibitions at the Israel Museum, the Tel Aviv Museum, the Herzliya Museum and the Tate Modern Museum in London, among other museums and galleries.

== Biography and art ==
Kuper was born in Kibbutz Mefalsim and began his artistic career in the 1980s. Between 1980 and 1982 he studied photography in the Hadassah College, Jerusalem. In the 1990s, he was the photography curator of a studio in Tel Aviv. In the early 1990s, he created the photographic series Vanishing zones, using non-professional cameras together with printing techniques that created blurry, hazy images. In works from the second half of the 1990s, Kuper began to explore Israeli landscapes while emphasizing the perspective of the artist. In the series Necropolis, created in 1996–2000, his photographs took on a political slant as, working with Gilad Ophir, he documented IDF training zones.

In his work, Kuper touches on broad philosophical issues, which he explores through the medium of photography. Also, his works examine the act and status of the medium of photography itself. Among his most prominent series and exhibitions are Vanishing Zones (1990–1994), Necropolis (1996–2000, with Gilad Ophir), Citrus (1999–2001), Ansar (2003), Like Stars in the Water (2005), War Situations (2006), To Eat of the Leviathan Flesh trilogy (2007), It Could Have Been Otherwise (2010) and Gaza Dream (2015).

Kuper's works have been exhibited in solo exhibitions at, among others, the Israel Museum, the Tel Aviv Museum, the Herzliya Museum and the Tate Modern Museum in London. A group of works from the series Necropolis was purchased by the Tate Modern and was in show at the museum during 2001–2002. Kuper also presented as part of group exhibitions, including an exhibition at the Negev Museum of Art in Be'er Sheva.

Kuper has published two books: "CITRUS/NECROPOLIS" (containing two groups of works) and "NO ESCAPE FROM THE PAST" (containing works from 2000 to 2007).

== Teaching ==
Alongside his activity as an artist, Kuper is engaged in teaching. Until 2009, he was a senior lecturer in the Department of Photography at Bezalel Academy of Arts and Design, Jerusalem. From 2008 to 2016, he was a senior lecturer in the Department of Art at the Shenkar College and in 2014, he received a professorship at that college. From 1994 to 1998, Kuper was head of the photography department at the Camera Obscura School of Art, Tel Aviv. In 2016, he was appointed acting head of the Shenkar Shenkar College of Engineering and Design.

== Awards ==
Kuper is a receiver of several important art awards, including the Gerard Levy Prize for a Young Photographer, from the Israel Museum, Jerusalem (1995); the George and Janet Jaffin Prize for Excellence in Plastic Arts from the America-Israel Cultural Foundation (2002); the Prize for Visual Arts from the Ministry of Education and Culture (2004); the Constantiner Photography Award for an Israeli Artist from Tel Aviv Museum of Art (2006) and the Enrique Kavlin Photography Prize from the Israel Museum, Jerusalem (2004–2005).
