= Maor Tsabari =

Israeli-French poet (born 1995)

- Tsabari, Shalom Hartman Institute (2024)
- Born: July 7, 1995 (age 31); Israel
- Citizenship: Israel / France
- Education: Hebrew University of Jerusalem, Van Leer Jerusalem Institute
- Occupations: Poet, Translator, Philosophy Lecturer, Strategic Advisor
- Years active: 2018–present
- Known for: Poetry, Translation, Continental Philosophy, Jewish Thought
- Awards: Ministry of Culture Prize for Poets; Rabinovich Foundation Prize; Rachel Negev Poetry Prize; Rothschild Foundation Prize; First Lady's Award for Hebrew Poetry - Honorable Mention

Maor Tsabari (מאור צברי; born July 7, 1995) is an Israeli-French poet, translator, and lecturer in continental philosophy and Jewish thought. He is a recipient of the First Lady's Award for Hebrew Poetry – Honorable Mention (2026), the Ministry of Culture and Rabinovich Foundation Prize for Poets (2025), and the Rachel Negev Poetry Prize from the Hebrew University of Jerusalem (2022). He has founded and managed non-profit organizations for physical and psychological rehabilitation following military injuries. He is a recipient of the Rothschild Foundation Prize for his contributions to victims of the massacre and the war (2024). He has served as a government strategic advisor in health, strategic planning, and policy.

== Biography ==
Tsabari was born to a French-Christian mother who converted to Judaism and a Yemenite-Jewish father. He grew up in Moshav Ora and studied at the Keshet High School, the Ein Prat Academy for Leadership, and the Yeshivat Siach Yitzchak in Efrat. Tsabari holds a bachelor's degree from the Faculty of Law and the Faculty of Humanities at the Hebrew University of Jerusalem. In 2012, he participated in "Portraits" (Hebrew: דיוקנאות), a documentary series produced by the Ministry of Education and the Center for Educational Technology (CET) featuring young Israelis with diverse viewpoints.

He served as a combatant and team commander in the Duvdevan Unit (holding the reserve rank of Major). In 2016, Chief of Staff Lt. Gen. Gadi Eizenkot awarded him officer ranks at the Officer Training School (Bahad 1) graduation ceremony, after graduating as the company's outstanding officer. On May 26, 2018, while serving as a team commander during an operational activity in Ramallah, he was wounded alongside Ronen Lubarsky, who died of his injuries two days later.

Following his discharge from the IDF, Tsabari founded and directed "Perichat HaDuvdevan" (Hebrew: פריחת הדובדבן), a framework dedicated to the physical and psychological rehabilitation of wounded combat personnel. He co-founded the "Back on Track" (Hebrew: בחזרה למסלול) forum, served as Head of Research and Policy at NATAL – The Israel Trauma and Resiliency Center, and managed the physical and mental rehabilitation department at the Brothers for Life organization.

=== Research and Academic Work ===
Tsabari has published poetry, essays, and translations, and is a member of advisory forums at the Van Leer Jerusalem Institute and the Mandel Leadership Institute. In 2018, he began publishing poems in national newspapers and various literary journals. In 2019, he began teaching as a lecturer in continental philosophy. His teaching methodology combines traditional Torah study with academic scholarship, following the path of Rabbi Dr. Benjamin Lau, under whom he studied Talmud since childhood.

Together with Dr. Dror Bondi, he translated one-third of Rabbi Prof. Abraham Joshua Heschel's Yiddish poems into Hebrew. He co-edited books by Prof. Shalom Rosenberg, with whom he formed a special relationship during his military service. His essay "On Trauma and Testimony" (2022) was written as part of the "Da'at Voyages" program at the Van Leer Jerusalem Institute, where he also serves as an advisor to the program's steering committee.

In 2022, his debut poetry manuscript Military Attaché (Hebrew: נספח צבאי) won the Rachel Negev Poetry Prize from the Hebrew University of Jerusalem. The collection was published in 2025 by Am Oved and received broad critical resonance, being described by scholars and critics as a groundbreaking masterpiece signaling a "new poetry" in Hebrew literature. In 2026, a musical audio album titled Military Attaché, based on his book, was released. His poems have been set to music and translated into various languages.

He was awarded the Ministry of Culture and Sport and Rabinovich Foundation Prize for Poets (2025) and received an Honorable Mention from the First Lady's Award for Hebrew Poetry (2026). He is a graduate of the Mandel Leadership Institute in Jewish Culture.

=== Public Activity ===
Tsabari has worked extensively to enhance governmental department efficiency and inter-agency cooperation. In 2020, he was recruited to the Prime Minister's Office within the Senior Department for Governance and Society, where he was part of a team working to reduce workforce shortages in physical therapy, speech therapy, and occupational therapy.

In 2022, he joined "Consul", a business-social non-profit strategic advisory organization that assists medium-sized manufacturing companies in implementing innovation and improving competitiveness. In 2023, Tsabari joined the 'Matvei Aviv' project within the Senior Department for Strategic Planning and Policy at the Civil Service Commission, aimed at improving departmental efficiency, control, and monitoring through systematic evaluation of working procedures with government and public entities.

He is the recipient of the Rothschild Foundation Prize for his contributions to victims of the massacre and the war (2024).

== Works ==
=== Poetry ===
- HaHar, HaBayit VeYadeinu (The Mountain, The House, and Our Hands), Meshiv HaRuach, Vol. 62, 2018.
- MiMidbar Mattanah (From the Wilderness a Gift – Poems on the Book of Numbers), Meshiv HaRuach, Vol. 68, 2019.
- Lo BeVat Achat (Not All at Once – Tribute to Yehuda Amichai), Meshiv HaRuach, Vol. 73, 2020.
- Unetanneh Tokef – Shever Piyyut VeHit'atzmut (In: Yondav Kaploun, Yedioth Books), 2024.
- Military Attaché (Hebrew: נספח צבאי), Am Oved, 2025.

=== Thought and Philosophy ===
- On Trauma and Testimony: An Inquiry into the Thought of Jean Améry and Emmanuel Levinas (Hebrew: על טראומה ועדות), The Van Leer Jerusalem Institute, 2022.

=== Editorial Work ===
==== Books by Prof. Shalom Rosenberg ====
- Narrow Bridge: Faith in a World of Doubt according to Rabbi Nachman of Breslov (Hebrew: גשר צר), Koren Publishers Jerusalem, 2023 (Co-editor).
- Shades of Jewish Thought: From the Kuzari to Levinas (Hebrew: המחשבה היהודית לגווניה), Koren Publishers Jerusalem, 2023 (Co-editor).

=== Translations ===
- On the Explicit Name: Adam (Hebrew: על השם המפורש: אדם), Private publication, 2023 (Co-translated with Renana Zin and Dr. Dror Bondi).
