= Nimrod Dweck =

Israeli writer, game designer, musician and civic activist

- נמרוד דוויק
- Dweck in 2025
- Born: 27 May 1981 (age 45); Israel
- Occupations: Writer; game designer; musician; civic activist
- Years active: 2000s–present
- Website: dweck.co.il

Nimrod Dweck (Hebrew: נמרוד דוויק; born 27 May 1981) is an Israeli writer, game designer, musician and civic activist. He was a co-founder and executive director of Victory 2015 (V15), a grassroots organization active during the 2015 Israeli legislative election, and later co-founded the Israeli civic movement Darkenu. Earlier in his career, he was active in the Israeli hip-hop scene as a member of Parvarim Refugeez and PR Trooperz.

== Early life and education ==
Dweck was born in Israel in 1981. He studied political science and international relations at the Open University of Israel and later completed a master's degree in philosophy and the history of science and ideas at Tel Aviv University. He also completed a game-design program at Shenkar College of Engineering, Design and Art.

== Music career ==
Dweck was a member of Parvarim Refugeez, an Israeli hip-hop group formed by musicians from the Modi'in–Maccabim–Reut area. The group released the album Rapperarium. A 2017 retrospective in Time Out Tel Aviv described Parvarim Refugeez as one of the significant groups in Israeli rap.

Dweck was also involved in the PR Trooperz hip-hop collective. The collective was later featured in the Israeli Public Broadcasting Corporation documentary series Zahav Shachor.

A 2024 Time Out Tel Aviv profile described Dweck as a former rapper and manager of Parvarim Refugeez, as well as the founder of the independent record label High Fiber.

In 2025, Dweck released the Hebrew-language spoken-word album Tmunat Matzav ("Snapshot").

== Game design and business career ==
Dweck founded the digital agency Dice Marketing and Rimon Studio, a game-development studio.

By the mid-2010s, Dweck's work focused in part on educational game design. A profile published by the Open University of Israel described him as the head of its game-design program at Hasifa and discussed several educational projects he had designed, including games dealing with history, Jewish studies and ethical dilemmas.

Dweck was also involved with the mobile-game company Multiby and its game Qliqi.

In 2026, Rimon Studio developed BADOOK!, an educational game intended to teach information literacy and the identification of misinformation. The Israel Internet Association stated that the game was designed and developed by Rimon Studio under Dweck's direction.

Dweck later became a lecturer at the Sammy Ofer School of Communications at Reichman University. A 2024 Time Out Tel Aviv profile described him as teaching marketing and innovation at the university.

Among the products developed through Beta were Nick Academy, an educational application using Nickelodeon intellectual property, and NickWatch, a children's smartwatch developed by WatchinU.

Nick Academy received the People's Choice Award at the Global EdTech Startup Awards. NickWatch received a Red Dot Award for product design in 2024.

== Political and civic activity ==
=== V15 ===
In late 2014, Dweck and Itamar Weizman co-founded Victory 2015, commonly known as V15, ahead of the 2015 Israeli election. The organization sought to increase turnout among voters who supported centrist and left-wing parties and advocated replacing the government led by Benjamin Netanyahu.

JTA identified Dweck as V15's executive director and reported on the group's use of voter data and door-to-door organizing. By February 2015, the organization had recruited thousands of volunteers.

During the final days of the campaign, JTA quoted Dweck on the organization's efforts to increase voter turnout among center-left voters.

V15 became a target of criticism from Netanyahu's Likud party, which alleged improper foreign involvement in the campaign. Dweck and Weizman rejected the accusations. Ynetnews profiled the two founders during the controversy.

A later United States Senate investigation found that U.S. State Department grant money provided to OneVoice had not been spent on V15's election campaign, although infrastructure previously developed with grant funding was subsequently used by the organization.

=== Darkenu ===
Following the 2015 election, Dweck became one of the founders of Darkenu, an Israeli civic organization. He initially served as its vice president for strategy and later became chief executive officer.

In 2017, Darkenu and Commanders for Israel's Security organized the annual rally commemorating the assassination of Prime Minister Yitzhak Rabin. The Times of Israel, carrying JTA reporting, identified Dweck as a Darkenu co-founder and chief strategist.

By 2024, Dweck was serving as Darkenu's chief executive officer. In March 2025, Channel 13 News also identified him as the organization's chief executive and founder while reporting on a Darkenu appeal concerning the appointment process for the head of the Shin Bet.

== Writing ==
Dweck's fantasy novel Shnei HaKvu'im (Hebrew: שני הקבועים) was published in 2019 and is held by the National Library of Israel.

In 2024, Dweck was selected for the PJ Library Sephardic Stories Initiative. In 2026, the Harold Grinspoon Foundation announced that his picture-book manuscript Signs of Magic had received a publishing deal through PJ Publishing. The story, set in nineteenth-century Tiberias, follows two sisters and explores different forms of knowledge.

== Selected works ==
=== Books ===
- Shnei HaKvu'im (2019)
- Signs of Magic (forthcoming)

=== Music ===
- Mitokh HaZohama – with PR Trooperz (2004)
- Rapperarium – with Parvarim Refugeez (2006)
- Tmunat Matzav (2025)
