= Roas =

Roas is a surname. Notable people with the surname include:

- David Roas (born 1965), Spanish writer and literary critic
- Moshe Roas (born 1981), Israeli artist
