= Peled =

Peled or Pelled (Hebrew: פלד, "steel") is a surname. Notable people with the surname include:

- Abe Peled, Israeli businessman
- Amit Peled
- Benny Peled (1928–2002), commander of the Israeli Air Force
- Doron A. Peled
- Efrat Peled
- Elad Peled (1927–2021), Israeli general
- Esther Peled, Israeli writer and psychologist
- Martin Peled-Flax
- Mattityahu Peled (1923–1995), Israeli military officer, scholar, and peace activist
- Micha Peled
- Miko Peled (born 1961), Israeli peace activist and author
- Moshe Peled (disambiguation), multiple persons
- Natan Peled (1913–1992), Israeli politician
- Nurit Peled-Elhanan, Israeli peace activist, daughter of Mattiyahu
- Paulina Peled (born 1950), Israeli tennis player
- Sariel Har-Peled
- Yaron Peled
- Yossi Peled (born 1941), Israeli general and politician
