= Moshe Roas =

Israeli artist (born 1981)

Moshe Roas משה רואס
- Born: 1981 (age 44–45); Safed, Israel
- Education: HaMidrasha – Faculty of the Arts, Shenkar College of Engineering and Design
- Known for: Contemporary art, Israeli art
- Awards: Keshet Award, Herzliya Museum of Contemporary Art; Design Prize, Ministry of Culture and Sport

Moshe Roas (Hebrew: משה רואס; born 1981) is an Israeli artist who works in sculpture, drawing, printmaking, and installation art. He has exhibited in galleries and museums in the Netherlands, Germany, Poland, the United States, South Korea, and Israel. These include the Tel Aviv Museum of Art, the Eretz Israel Museum, the Jerusalem Print Workshop, and the Tel Aviv Artists' House.

Many of his works are created in processes of decomposition and reassembly, and deal with decay, life, death, and time. Roas lives in Kibbutz Palmachim and teaches printmaking in Tel Aviv and Givat Haviva.

In 2026 he received the Keshet Award by the Herzliya Museum of Contemporary Art.

== Biography ==
Roas was born in Safed and grew up in Karmiel. He studied textile design at Shenkar College of Engineering and Design, where he graduated in 2008. In 2009, he was awarded the Young Designer Competition in Talente, Munich, and an honorable mention at an international art competition in Cheongju, South Korea. In 2014 he was awarded the design prize by the Ministry of Culture and Sport and a guest artist's scholarship at the Jerusalem Print Workshop. In the years 2016–2018, he studied at the Postgraduate Fine Art Program at HaMidrasha – Faculty of the Arts, Beit Berl College. He also studied printmaking in Venice and Portland, Maine.

== Exhibitions ==
=== Solo exhibitions ===
- And the Winners are: Prizes of the Ministry of Culture and Sport for Art and Design, Tel Aviv Museum, 2014, Curators: Maya Vinitzky and Noa Rosenberg
- Artist Wall: Einat Amir hosts Moshe Roas, Art Cube Artists' Studios, Jerusalem, 2014
- Undoing, Periscope Gallery, 2013, curator: Irena Gordon

=== Group exhibitions ===
- Exercises in Flexibility, HaMidrasha Gallery – Hayarkon 19, Tel Aviv, 2018. Curator: Nogah Davidson
- On the Edge – Israeli Paper, Eretz Israel Museum, Tel Aviv, 2017. Curator: Anat Gatenio
- Sculpture: Allegories of the Present, Artists' House, Tel Aviv, 2016. curator: Irena Gordon
- Same Sky Same land, Pulchri Studio, The Hague, Netherlands, 2015. Curator: Uri Tzaig
- Same Sky Same land, LJGalerie, Amsterdam, Netherlands, 2015. Curator: Uri Tzaig
- The Design Museum at the Artists' House, Artists' House, Tel Aviv, 2014, Curator: Yuval Saar
- Woven Consciousness – Biennale for Textile, Eretz Israel Museum, 2014. Curator: Irena Gordon
- Traces V – Beyond Paper, Jerusalem, 2013. Curator: Tal Yahas
- Fresh Design 6 / 2013, Design Fair, Tel Aviv.
- International Contemporary Furniture Fair – ICFF, New York City, 2013
- 14 International Triennial of Tapestry Łódź, Poland, 2013
- TextiLiri, Periscope Gallery, 2012, curator: Ayala Raz
- Expo 2012, Yeosu, South Korea
- Fresh Paint 5 / 2012, Art Fair, Tel Aviv
- Pass Forward, The Ranch Gallery, Holon, 2011
- Hot – Innovation in Design, Mitchell Gallery, Shenkar College of Engineering and Design, Ramat Gan, 2009. Curator: Prof. Yarom Vardimon
- The 6th Cheongju International Craft Competition, South Korea, 2009
- Talente 2009, International Young Designers Exhibition, Munich, (Germany)
