= Al-Jura, Jerusalem =

Al-Jura الجورة
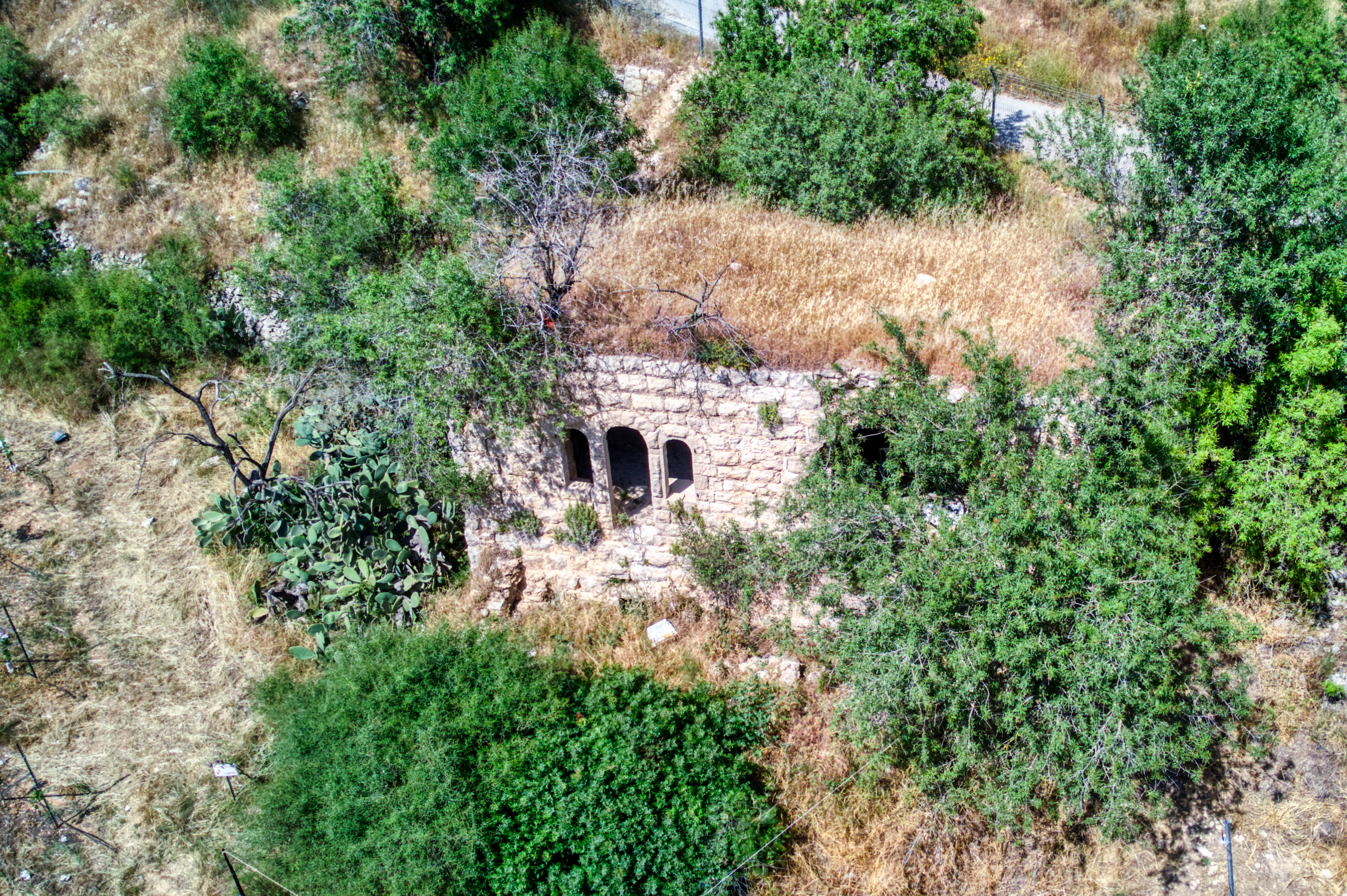
- a ruined house, one of the last remains of the village
- Etymology: The water hole
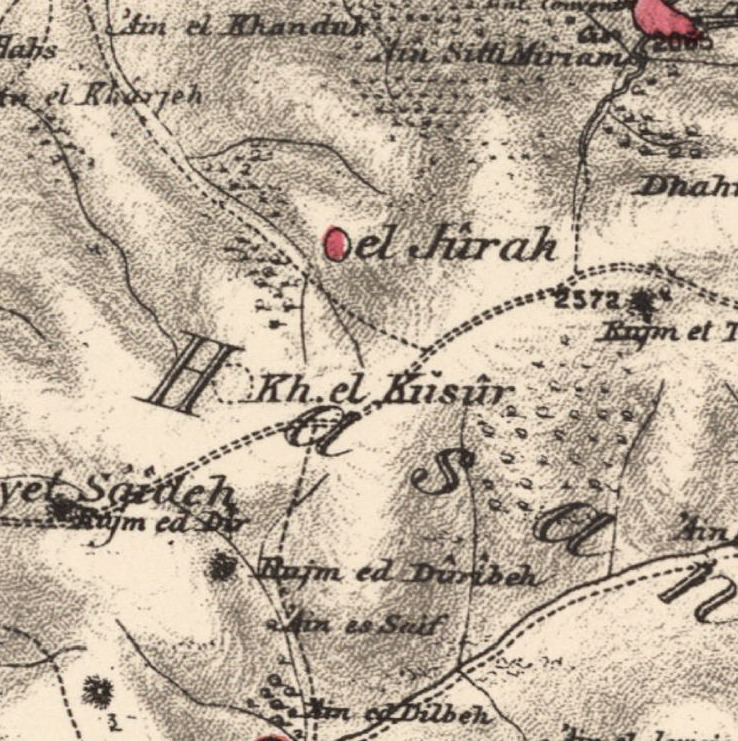
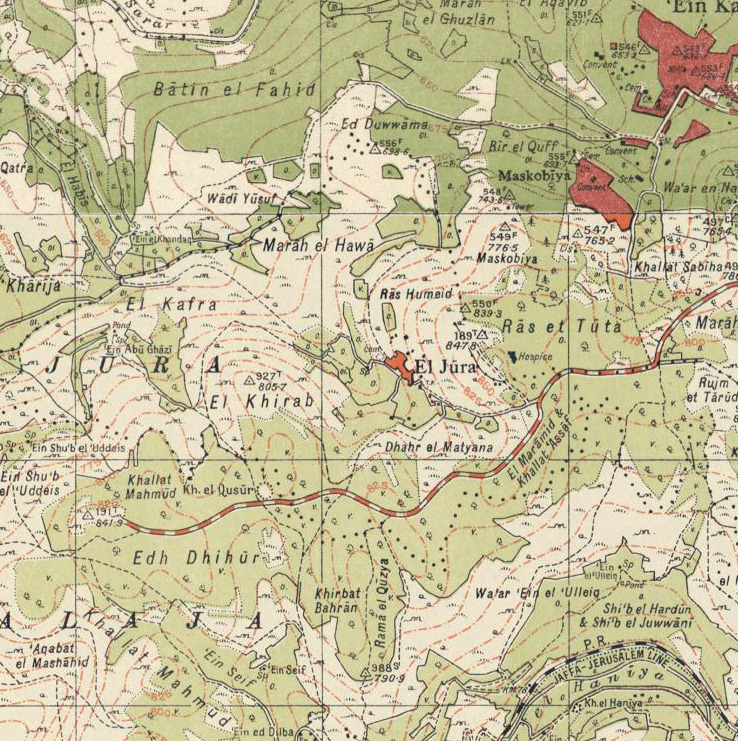
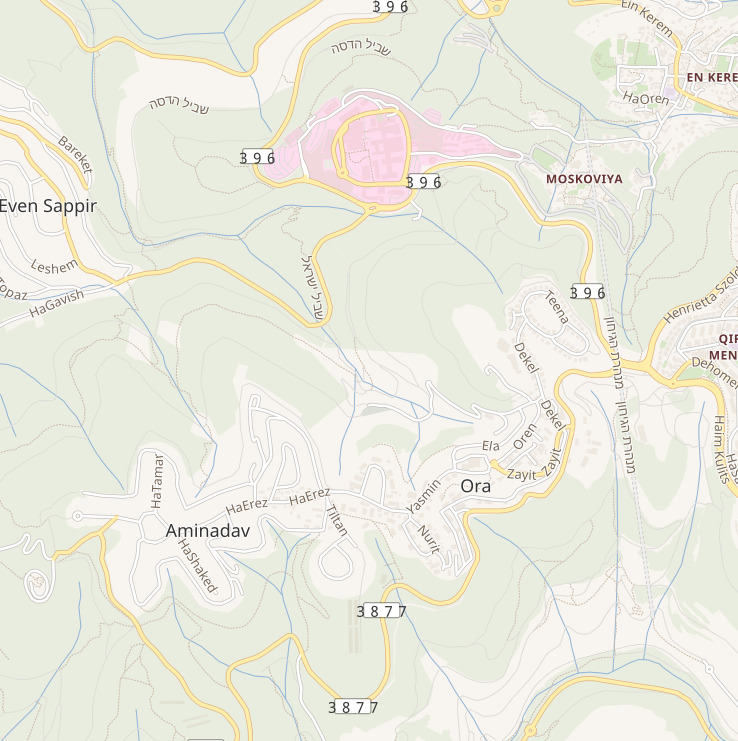
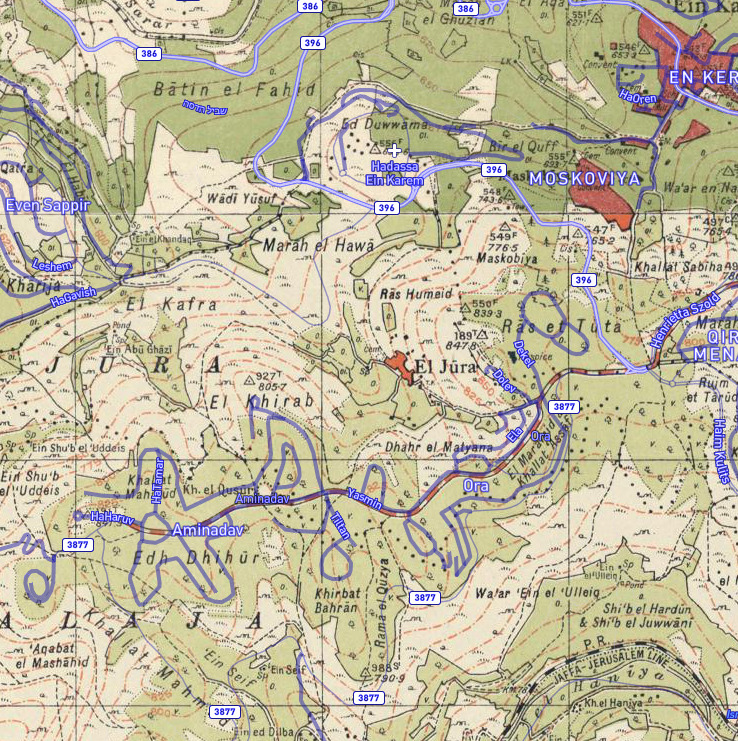
- 1870s map 1940s map modern map 1940s with modern overlay map A series of historical maps of the area around Al-Jura, Jerusalem (click the buttons)

- Location within Mandatory Palestine
- Coordinates: 31°45′25″N 35°08′56″E
- Palestine grid: 164/129
- Geopolitical entity: Mandatory Palestine
- Subdistrict: Jerusalem
- Date of depopulation: Not known

Area
  - Total: 4,158 dunams (4.158 km^{2}; 1.605 sq mi)

Population (1945)
  - Total: 420
- Current Localities: Ora

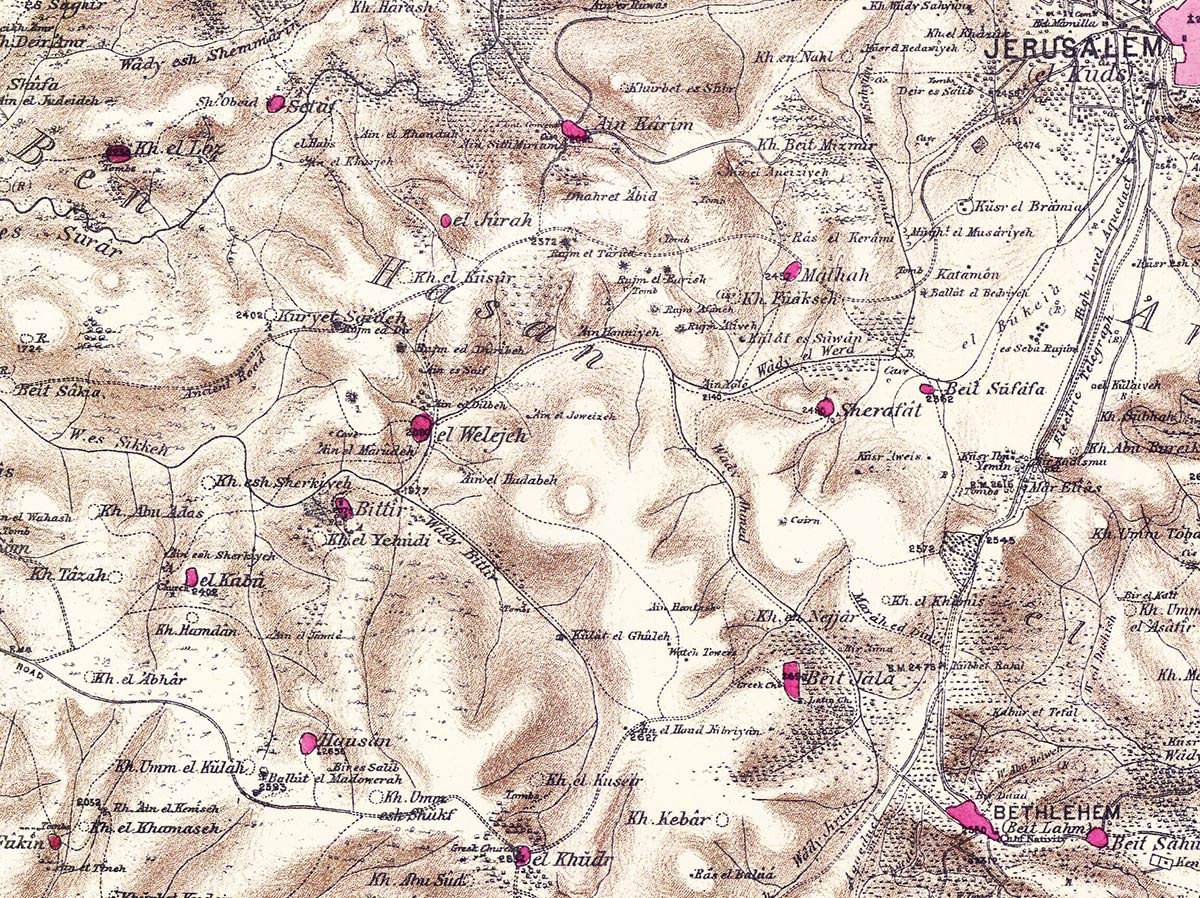
el Jurah in the 1870s

Al-Jura (el Jurah) was a Palestinian Arab village in the Jerusalem Subdistrict. It was depopulated during the 1948 Arab-Israeli War on July 11, 1948, under Operation Danny. It was located 8.5 km west of Jerusalem. al-Jura was mostly destroyed with the exception of several deserted houses.

== History ==
Just west of al-Jura there were two Khirbats from the Byzantine era: Khirbat Sa'ida and Ayn al-Jadida. Crusader presence were at Khirbat al-Qusur, (grid.no 163/128).

=== Ottoman era ===
Khirbat al-Qusur was mentioned in the Ottoman 1596 tax registers, as a place in the Al Quds region. It had 27 Muslim households, who paid a total of 4,500 akçe in taxes.

In 1838 el-Jurah was noted as a Muslim village, part of Beni Hasan area, located west of Jerusalem.

In 1863 Victor Guérin noted about Al-Jura: "A small village of a hundred inhabitants, fed by a rather abundant source, the water of which flows into a basin. I observed several caves cut in the rock. The valley which extends to the bottom of the village is covered with figs, olive trees and vines."

An Ottoman village list from about 1870 found that the village had a population of 84, in a total of 20 houses, though the population count included men, only.

In 1883, the PEF's Survey of Western Palestine described El Jurah as "a small hamlet on the slope of the ridge, with olives below it, and a spring in the valley, about 3/4 mile to the north."

In 1896 the population of Ed-dschora was estimated to be about 150 persons.

=== British Mandate era ===
In the 1922 census of Palestine conducted by the British Mandate authorities, Jarah had a population of 234 Muslims, increasing in the 1931 census to 329 Muslims, in 63 houses.

In the 1945 statistics the village had a population of 420 Muslims, while the total land area was 4,158 dunams, according to an official land and population survey. Of this, 2,125 were used for plantations and irrigable land, 846 for cereals, while 27 dunams were classified as built-up areas.

=== 1948 and aftermath ===
Following the war, the area was incorporated into the State of Israel. The moshav of Ora was established land that had belonged to al-Jura in 1950.

In 1992, the village site was described: "The only structures that still stand are two limestone houses on the valley floor at the southern edge of the village. The larger house is a rectangular, two-storey building; its second storey has two arched doors, each of which is flanked by two arched windows. Almond groves cover a terrace built on the valley floor. Fig, carob, and cypress trees and cactuses grow on the site. One can see the ruins of houses, staircases, and wells on the adjacent land. The site is surrounded by cypress forests."

=== Gallery ===
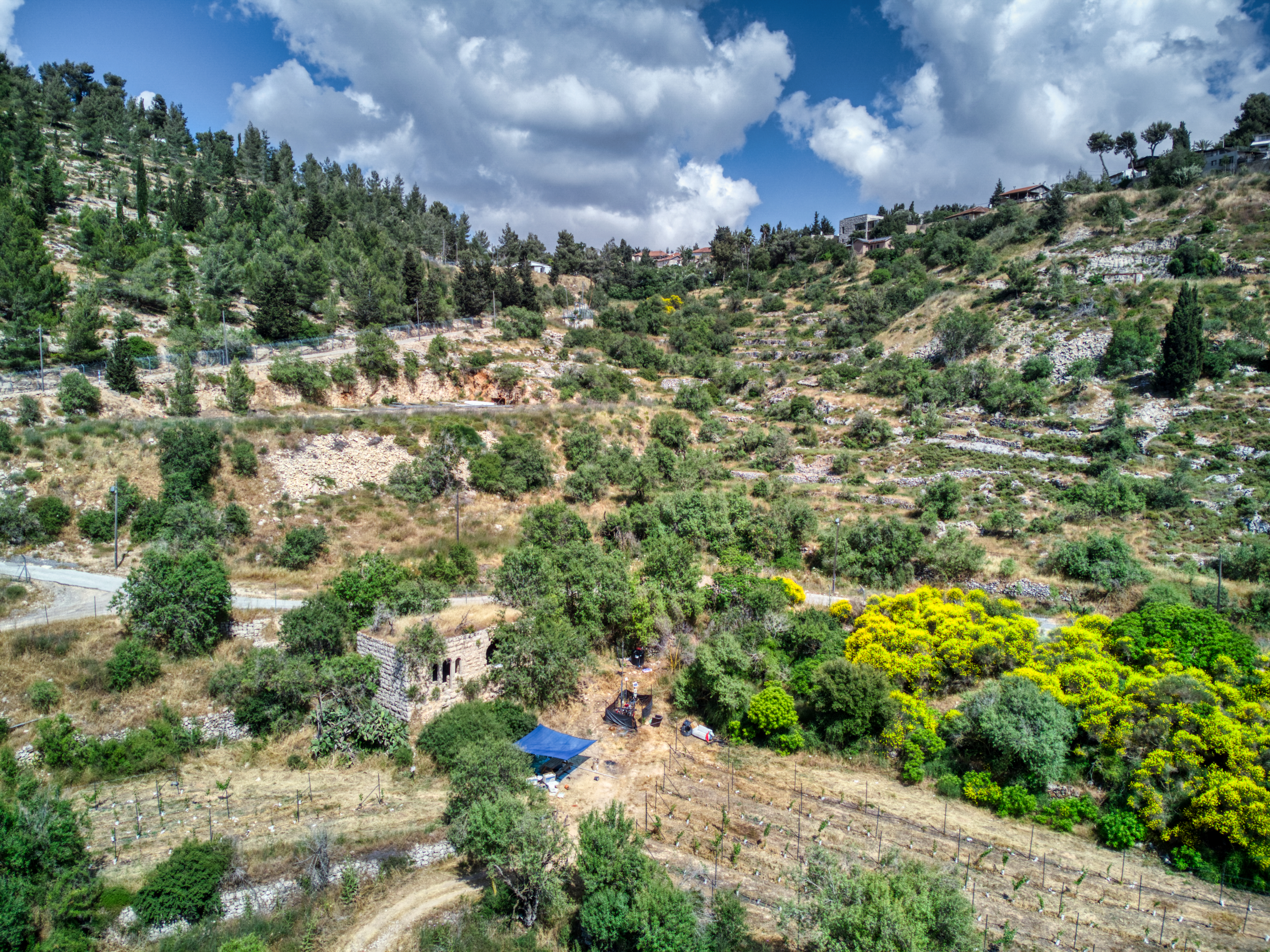
the southmost house of the village, the only one that is not totally ruined. Houses of Ora village can be seen above

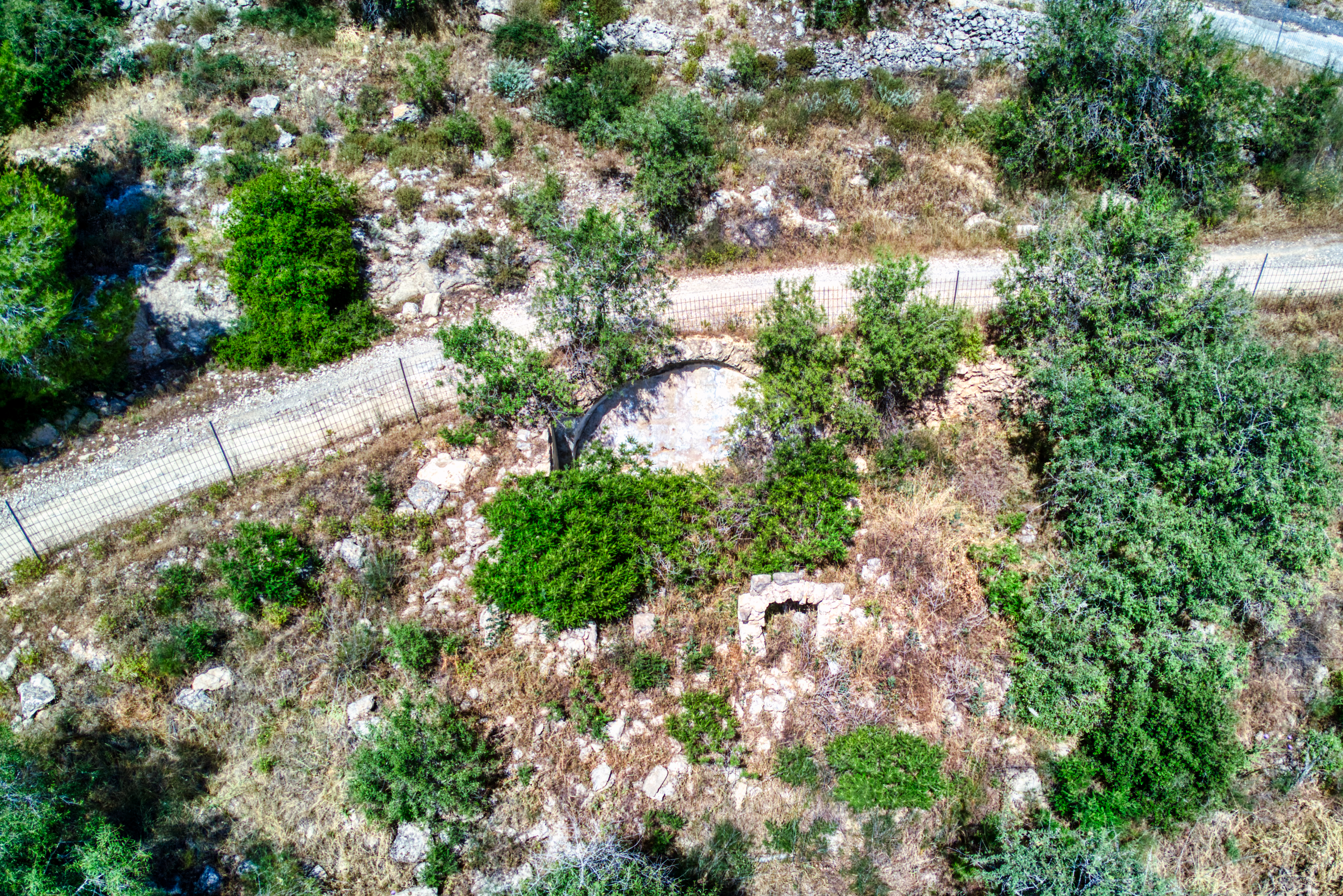
additianal remains of the village

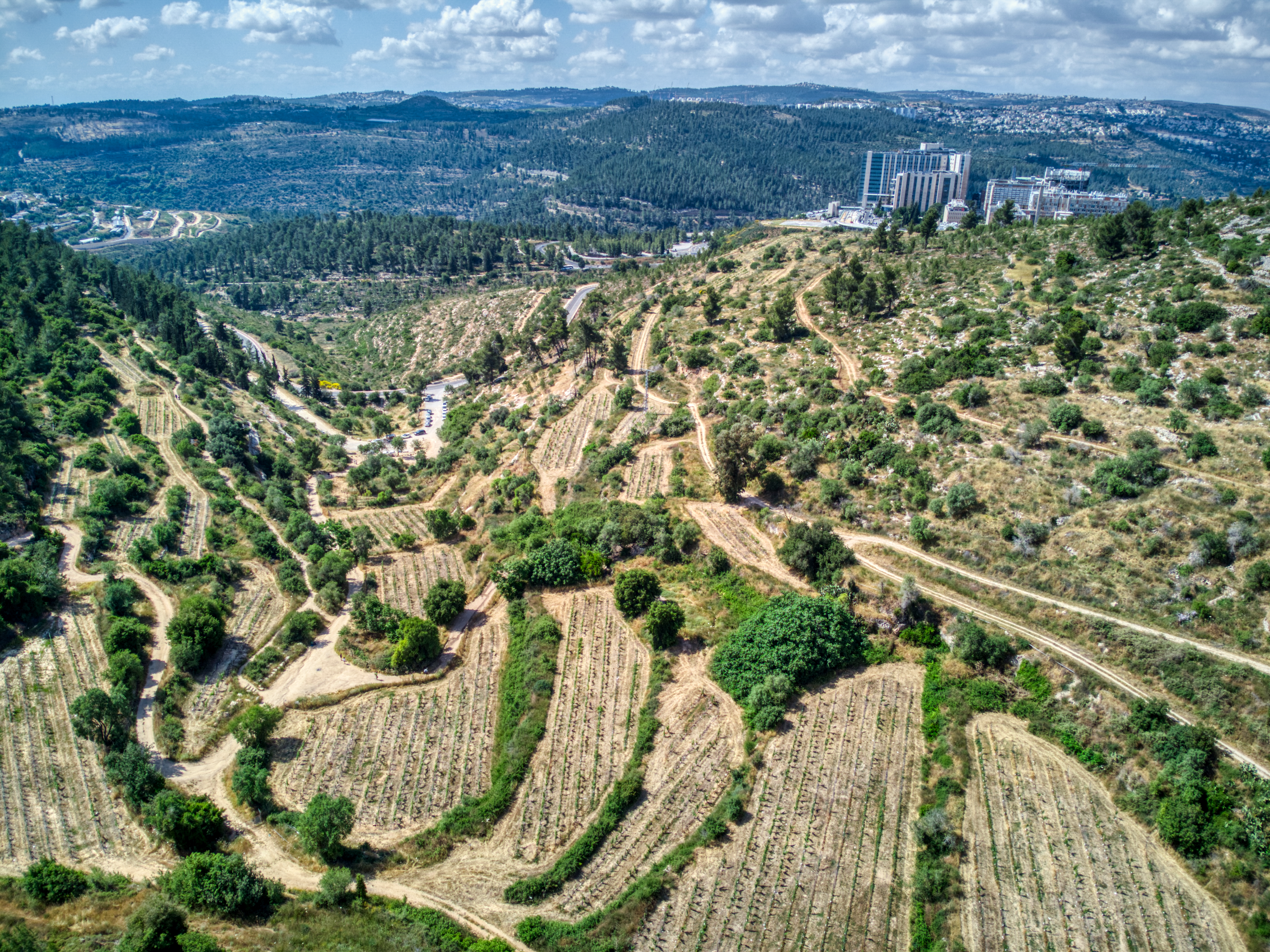
the village was mainly on the right spur of the valley

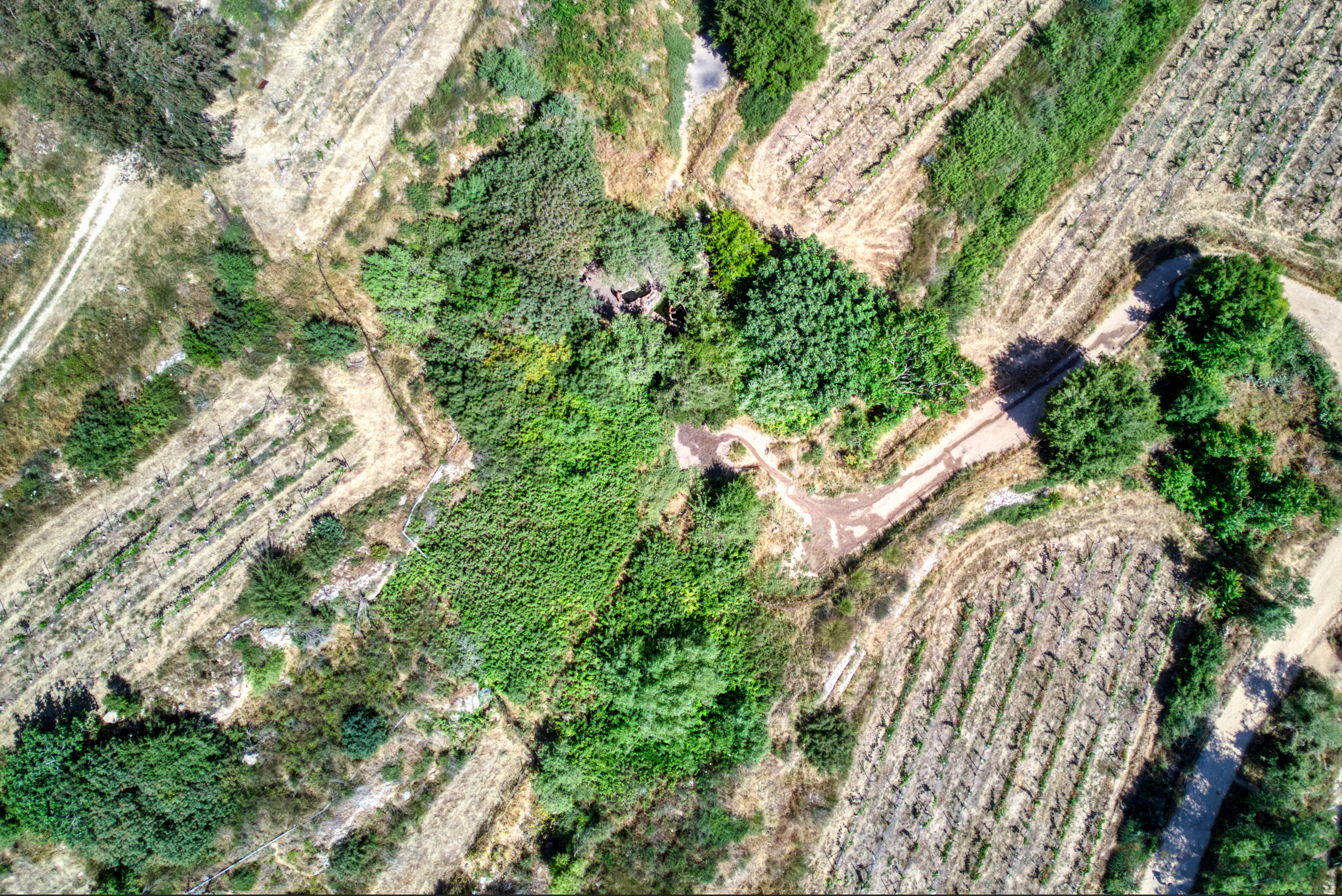
The village spring can be seen in the high vegetation. It is named nowadays "Ein Sarig"

== Bibliography ==
- Barron, J.B., ed. (1923). Palestine: Report and General Abstracts of the Census of 1922. Government of Palestine.
- Conder, C.R.; Kitchener, H.H. (1883). The Survey of Western Palestine: Memoirs of the Topography, Orography, Hydrography, and Archaeology. Vol. 3. London: Committee of the Palestine Exploration Fund.
- Department of Statistics (1945). Village Statistics, April, 1945. Government of Palestine.
- Guérin, V. (1869). Description Géographique Historique et Archéologique de la Palestine (in French). Vol. 1: Judee, pt. 2. Paris: L'Imprimerie Nationale.
- Hadawi, S. (1970). Village Statistics of 1945: A Classification of Land and Area ownership in Palestine. Palestine Liberation Organization Research Center. Archived from the original on 2018-12-08.
- Hartmann, M. (1883). "Die Ortschaftenliste des Liwa Jerusalem in dem türkischen Staatskalender für Syrien auf das Jahr 1288 der Flucht (1871)". Zeitschrift des Deutschen Palästina-Vereins. 6: 102–149.
- Hütteroth, W.-D.; Abdulfattah, K. (1977). Historical Geography of Palestine, Transjordan and Southern Syria in the Late 16th Century. Erlanger Geographische Arbeiten, Sonderband 5. Erlangen, Germany: Vorstand der Fränkischen Geographischen Gesellschaft. ISBN 3-920405-41-2.
- Khalidi, W. (1992). All That Remains: The Palestinian Villages Occupied and Depopulated by Israel in 1948. Washington D.C.: Institute for Palestine Studies. ISBN 0-88728-224-5.
- Mills, E, ed. (1932). Census of Palestine 1931. Population of Villages, Towns and Administrative Areas. Jerusalem: Government of Palestine.
- Morris, B. (2004). The Birth of the Palestinian Refugee Problem Revisited. Cambridge University Press. ISBN 978-0-521-00967-6.
- Palmer, E.H. (1881). The Survey of Western Palestine: Arabic and English Name Lists Collected During the Survey by Lieutenants Conder and Kitchener, R. E. Transliterated and Explained by E.H. Palmer. Committee of the Palestine Exploration Fund.
- Robinson, E.; Smith, E. (1841). Biblical Researches in Palestine, Mount Sinai and Arabia Petraea: A Journal of Travels in the year 1838. Vol. 3. Boston: Crocker & Brewster.
- Schick, C. (1896). "Zur Einwohnerzahl des Bezirks Jerusalem". Zeitschrift des Deutschen Palästina-Vereins. 19: 120–127.
- Socin, A. (1879). "Alphabetisches Verzeichniss von Ortschaften des Paschalik Jerusalem". Zeitschrift des Deutschen Palästina-Vereins. 2: 135–163.
