= Nili Lotan =

Israeli-American fashion designer

- נילי לוטן
- Born: Netanya, Israel
- Occupation: Fashion Designer
- Known for: Founder of Nili Lotan Design Studio in New York City

Nili Lotan (Hebrew: נילי לוטן) is an Israeli-American fashion designer best known as the founder of the Nili Lotan Design Studio, a designer clothing company.

== Biography ==
Nili Shapira (later Lotan) was born in Netanya, Israel. Her father, Moshe Shapira, was a real estate developer there.

She served for two years in the Israeli Air Force before attending Shenkar Fashion Institute in Tel Aviv. Lotan notes publicly that her early life, having been raised by European parents in Israel, and military service have been important influences on her approach to design. Lotan has three children and resides in the Tribeca neighborhood of New York City.

She is married to David Broza, a multi-platinum Israeli singer-songwriter and guitarist.

== Fashion career ==
Lotan’s career began in 1980 after relocation to New York City. She subsequently worked her way to the post of head designer at Nautica and Ralph Lauren; having spent years previous perfecting her craft as a senior designer for Adrienne Vittadini and Liz Claiborne.

In 2003, moving on from her corporate design roles, Lotan opted to launch her own collection under the Nili Lotan label. Military-style jackets quickly became Lotan’s trademark at her new company; and the brand has since evolved into producing a full range of women's clothing for all seasons. Lotan now sells her signature clothing in over 150 stores worldwide.

In 2006, Nili Lotan opened her first store in Tribeca New York where she combines her design studio with a retail space.

Notable celebrities known to wear Nili Lotan clothing include Paris Hilton, Sandra Bernhard, Liza Minnelli, Martha Stewart, Selena Gomez, Kendall Jenner, Rihanna, Gigi Hadid, Gisele Bündchen, Natasha Poly, Gal Gadot, Gwyneth Paltrow, Demi Moore, Heidi Klum, and Kim Kardashian.

In 2021, Lotan received criticism for using the tatreez in her designs, labelled as cultural appropriation by fashion bloggers and Palestinians, and for labelling the garments Palestinian.

== See also ==
- Israeli fashion
