= Efrat =

Efrat (Hebrew: אפרת) is a name with Hebrew origins that can also refer to:

- Efrat (given name), Israeli given name
- Efrat (surname), Israeli surname
- Efrat (Israeli settlement) (also, Efrata)
- Efrat (organization), an Israeli anti-abortion organization
- Ephrath, a biblical place in Judea, for which the modern settlement of Efrat is named

== See also ==
- Bar-Efrat
