= Roy Efrat =

Israeli-German visual artist

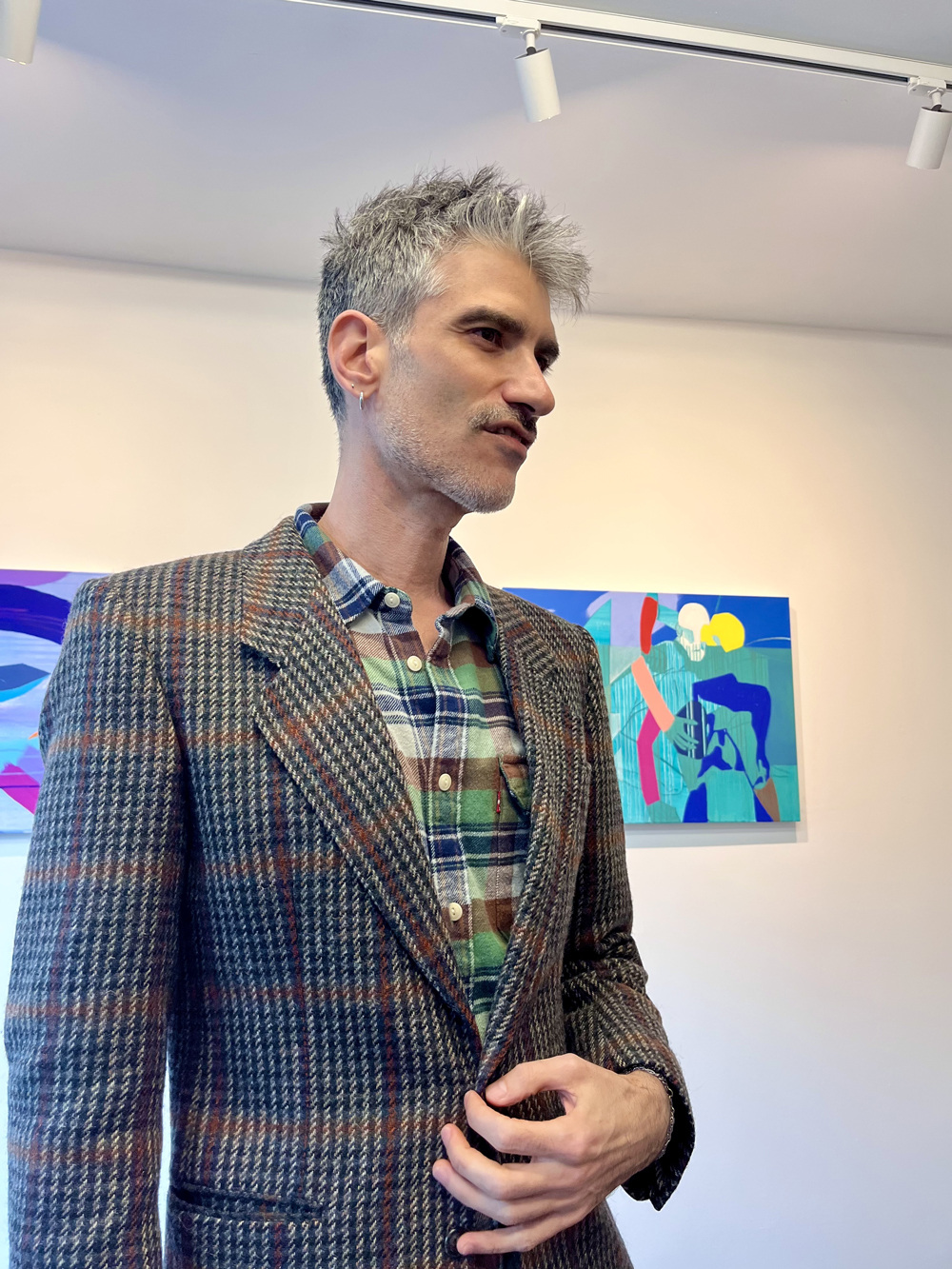
Roy Efrat

Roy Efrat (Hebrew: רועי אפרת; born July 22, 1979) is an Israeli-German visual artist who lives and works in Berlin. He works with painting, video, installation, and augmented reality (AR), and engages with a myth from Jewish tradition and figures from Greek mythology.

== Early life and education ==
Roy Efrat was born in Jerusalem in 1979 and lived there until he was 19. He trained and worked as a dancer with the choreographer Yehudit Arnon in Kibbutz Ga'aton. Later, he performed under choreographers such as Yossi Yungman, Noa Dar, Maya Brinner, and Anat Katz. He received a B.F.A. from Shenkar College of Engineering, Design and Art in 2013 and an MFA from the Painting department at the Royal College of Art in London in 2018. His thesis is Painting with Video Intervention. The painting is an arena for both arrested and dynamic movement.

== Works ==
Efrat’s practice began with projecting video onto painted surfaces and evolved into immersive installations and augmented reality environments. Solo Exhibitions such as Lights Out at Braverman Gallery and Dialectic (2015) focused on painting installations with complex layered video surfaces. His 2016 installation Deadlock at Kibbutz Be'eri's gallery used five synchronized projections and painted structures, ending with a projection of fire covering the entire gallery space. Later projects introduced video mapping and augmented reality to address visual perception and narrative, including Trap (ArtLacuna) and Othering (Wannsee Contemporary). With choreographer Mami Shimazaki, he developed 2009 several collaborative works, such as Flood Soda, Wonder Fall, Der Dybbuk, and Between Two Worlds at the Negev Museum of Art.

He collaborated with artist Catrin Webster at the URRA Residency in Buenos Aires in 2015. Their joint projects include Pansy (Glynn Vivian Art Gallery and Aberystwyth Arts Centre), (November 2024). Passing (ArtLacuna 2020), and Orlando: Metamorphosis (Green Man Festival 2022). With Adam Kalderon, Efrat has co-created performances (The Usher 2009, Flood 2011, Soda 2012), visual works (Gifted 2017, The Maids 2018, Inn a Box 2018), and contributed to Kalderon’s films Marzipan Flowers (2014) and The Swimmer (2021). Efrat also composes original music for his video works.

=== Themes ===
Roy Efrat’s work addresses identity, gender, otherness, vulnerability, and mythology. His installations explore emotional states, cultural displacement, and personal memory. He often draws inspiration from writers like Franz Kafka and Thomas Mann, whose focus on alienation and identity echoes throughout his practice. In Dialect (2015), Efrat examines the architectural, spiritual, and emotional structure of the Taharah Mikveh for Men, exploring the intersection of religious, secular, and masculine identity. The work uses drawing and video, where light reveals images and movement becomes essential to the narrative. In his collaborative project Pansy (2020–24) with artist Catrin Webster, Efrat explores overlapping meanings of the word “pansy,” referencing Kafka’s The Castle, and addressing themes of identity, sexuality, and perception; showing Pansy as a large scale installation combining oil painting and a large scale video mapped painting.

=== Mediums ===
Efrat combines painting with video, projection, and augmented reality (AR), often layering digital media directly onto physical surfaces. His background in dance informs the rhythm and composition of his visual work. He has described his paintings as “stages for performance,” and frequently collaborates with performers and choreographers.

== Personal life ==
Efrat is in a relationship with filmmaker Adam Kalderon. They live in Berlin.

== Awards and residencies ==
- 2011 - The Talia Sidi Award for best young artist, Shenkar College of Engineering, Design and Art.
- 2013 - Calcalist's promising artist award, second place.
- 2015 - URRA Art Residencies and Exchanges, Buenos Aires, Argentina.
- 2015 - 19th Japan Media Arts Festival, Jury Selection.
- 2018 - Tiffany & Co. x Outset Studiomakers Prize.

== Exhibitions ==
- 2015 - Lights Out, Braverman Gallery, Tel Aviv.
- 2016 - Deadlock, Kibbutz Be'eri Gallery.
- 2017 - Trap, ArtLacuna, London.
- 2020 - Pansy, Catrin Webster, Glynn Vivian Art Gallery, Swansea, Wales.
- 2020 - Passing, with Catrin Webster, ArtLacuna, London.
- 2022 - Orlando: Metamorphosis, Catrin Webster, Green Man Festival, Crickhowell.
- 2024 - Burst, Braverman Gallery, Tel Aviv.
- 2024 - Pansy, Aberystwyth Arts Centre, Wales, and Catrin Webster.
- 2025 – Othering, Wannsee Contemporary, Berlin.

=== Selected group exhibitions ===
- 2016 - The Daily Image - July, Erev-Rav.com.
- 2016 - Traces VI, the 6th Biennale for Drawing in Israel, Barbur Gallery, Jerusalem.
- 2017 - Untitled#, Braverman Gallery, Tel Aviv.
- 2018 - Living Room, Safe House, London.
- 2018 - RCA Graduation show, Sackler building, Royal College of Art, London.
- 2018 – TBCTV, featured in a Somerset House studios members' Mel Brimfield, Ewan Jones, and Chloe Lamford exhibition, Somerset House, London.
- 2019 - Hello World, Braverman Gallery, Tel Aviv.
- 2022 - Motion: Movement and Dance in Contemporary Art, Negev Museum of Art, Beer Sheva.
- 2023 - Channelling: Outset Studiomakers Corridor, Frieze Art Fair, London.
