= Meir Sternberg =

Israeli literary critic and biblical scholar

- מאיר שטרנברג
- Born: 3 October 1944
- Occupations: Literary critic, Biblical scholar
- Title: Artzt Professor of Poetics and Comparative Literature
- Awards: Israel Prize (1996)

Academic work
- Notable works: Expositional Modes and Temporal Ordering in Fiction; The Poetics of Biblical Narrative

Meir Sternberg (Hebrew: מאיר שטרנברג; born October 3, 1944) is an Israeli literary critic and biblical scholar. He is Artzt Professor of Poetics and Comparative Literature at Tel Aviv University. Along with Robert Alter and Adele Berlin, Sternberg is one of the most prominent practitioners of a literary approach to the Bible.

== Work ==
Sternberg made an important contribution to narrative theory in his book Expositional Modes and Temporal Ordering in Fiction, first published in Johns Hopkins University Press (1978) and later in Indiana University Press (1993). In his book Sternberg systematically explores how the order of information offered by the literary text creates for readers effects such as curiosity, suspense and surprise by analyzing examples that range from Homer's Odyssey to selected modern novels. Sternberg's contribution in this book to Narratology, with its emphasis on the effects of the literary texts on readers, can be seen as part of Reader-response criticism.

Sternberg is best known for his 1985 book The Poetics of Biblical Narrative. Sternberg argues that the Bible is a "foolproof composition": any reader who reads the Bible in "good faith" will get the point of what is written. He believes the Bible is written by an omniscient narrator, who has had things revealed to him by an omniscient God. Sternberg also makes much of "gaps" in narration, in which the narrator withholds truth in order to generate ambiguity. Finally, he argues that the biblical authors were concerned with three central elements in their narratives: aesthetics, history, and ideology. Jeffrey Staley suggests that, along with Robert Alter, Adele Berlin, and Shimon Bar-Efrat, Sternberg is a master of "leading the reader through the sudden twists and sharp turns, the steep ridges and dizzying drop-offs that make up the art of ancient Hebrew characterization."

Sternberg was the editor of the academic journal Poetics Today from 1994 to 2016. He was awarded the Israel Prize in 1996, for his contributions to literary theory.
