= Shimon Bar-Efrat =

Israeli Old Testament scholar

- שמעון בר-אפרת
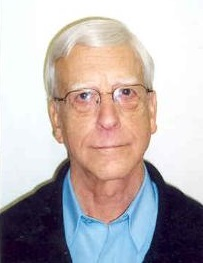
- Born: 1929
- Died: 2010 (aged 80–81)
- Occupation: Old Testament scholar

Academic work
- Discipline: Biblical studies
- Sub-discipline: Hebrew scriptures
- Institutions: Hebrew University Secondary School in Jerusalem

Shimon Bar-Efrat (Hebrew: שמעון בר-אפרת; 1929–2010) was an Israeli Old Testament scholar. He was Head of Biblical Studies at the Hebrew University Secondary School in Jerusalem, and is best known for his book, Narrative Art in the Bible, in which he "provides a catalogue of literary techniques and devices found in Old Testament narratives." Jeffrey Staley suggests that, along with Robert Alter, Adele Berlin, and Meir Sternberg, Bar-Efrat is a master of "leading the reader through the sudden twists and sharp turns, the steep ridges and dizzying drop-offs that make up the art of ancient Hebrew characterization."

Bar-Efrat had also written commentaries on 1 Samuel and 2 Samuel.

He died unexpectedly in 2010.

== Works ==
Bar-Efrat, Shimeon (1989). Narrative art in the Bible. Journal for the study of the Old Testament, Supplement series. Vol. 70. Sheffield, England: Almond Press. ISBN 978-1-850-75138-0. OCLC 25316726.

n.b. other works have been written in Hebrew.
