= Murder of Yaron and Efrat Ungar =

1996 shooting near Beit Shemesh, Israel

- Part of Israeli–Palestinian conflict
- The attack site
- Native name: רצח ירון ואפי (אפרת) אונגר
- Location: 31°44′27″N 34°52′42″E; Route 383 near moshav Gefen
- Date: June 9, 1996; 30 years ago
- Attack type: Shooting attack
- Weapon: Machine gun
- Deaths: 2 Israeli civilians
- Perpetrator: Izz ad-Din al-Qassam Brigades
- No. of participants: 2 Palestinian gunmen

The murder of Yaron and Efrat Ungar was a shooting attack on June 9, 1996, during which two Palestinian gunmen killed Yaron and Efrat Ungar as they drove on a road between Jerusalem and Tel Aviv, Israel near Beit Shemesh. The Palestinian gunmen fired twenty bullets from their Mitsubishi van into the couple's car. Although the bullets missed the couple's one-year-old son, who was in a car seat in the back, both Yaron and Efrat were killed.

The Ungars estate sued Yasser Arafat, the Palestine Liberation Organization, and the Islamic group Hamas in March 2000 in a Providence, Rhode Island, United States federal court house for wrongful death due to the defendants' encouragement of terrorism in the Kiryat Arba region. Although the estate won $116 million in 2004, the judgment was overturned on appeal in 2010, while the Ungars estate, the Palestine Liberation Organization, and the Palestinian Authority entered into a confidential settlement in February 2011 to end the case.

== Background ==
Yaron and Efrat Ungar were a married couple who, along with their one-year-old son Yishai and two-year-old son Dvir, lived in Kiryat Arba, an urban Israeli settlement on the outskirts of Hebron, in the Judean Mountains region of the West Bank. In 1996, country ownership of the region was disputed and residence of Kiryat Arba had been subjected to multiple terrorist attacks.

== The attack ==
On June 9, 1996, the couple drove back from a wedding they attended during the night, on the Kiryat Malachi-Beit Shemesh road (Route 383) with their one-year-old son Yishai, who was seated in a car seat in the back. The Ungars were on their way to pick up their son Dvir from his grandmother's house.

When they drove near moshav Gefen, two Palestinian gunmen pulled up alongside in a Mitsubishi van and fired 20 bullets into the front seat of the Ungar's moving car. Both Yaron and Efrat were killed but Yishai survived.

It was later determined that one of the weapons, a Kalashnikov assault rifle, was the same weapon used in a January 1996 attack that killed two Israeli soldiers.

=== Victims ===
- Efrat Ungar, 24, of Kiryat Arba
- Yaron Ungar, 25, of Kiryat Arba

== The perpetrators ==
The attack was carried out by a Palestinian militant cell, belonging to the Izz ad-Din al-Qassam Brigades, from the West Bank village of Surif.

== Aftermath ==
Memorial plaque for Yaron and Efi Ungar in a synagogue in Sha'arei Tikva.

In March 2000, the Unger estate, filed a lawsuit against defendants Yasser Arafat, the PLO, and the Islamic group Hamas in Providence, Rhode Island because the estate held dual citizenship in America and Israel (Yaron was born in New York City) and the Israeli court appointed executor for the couple's estate, attorney David J. Strachman, was from Providence. The estate sought $250 million in the civil lawsuit for the June 9, 1996 drive-by shooting murders of Ungars near Bet Shemesh, Israel due to the defendants encouragement of terrorism in the region. Although his law practice did not include international terrorism civil law at the time, Strachman took the position of lead attorney in the United States and with Nitsana Darshan-Leitner, an Israeli attorney, human rights activist, and the founder of Shurat HaDin Israeli Law Center, providing legal support in Israel. In January 2004, the estate won a judgment against Hamas in the Providence federal court for the Ungar murders and ordered Hamas to pay the families of the Ungars $116 million. In July of that year, the estate obtained a default judgment against the PNA and the PLO in the same case. Six years later, in 2010, the appeals court overturned the ruling and sent the case back to U.S. District Court to allow the Palestine Liberation Organization and the Palestinian Authority to present their side. In February 2011, the Ungar estate obtained a confidential settlement and ended the case.

=== Release of assailant ===
On 18 October 2011 Rahman Ghanimat, who was originally sentenced to 5 life sentences for his part in the killing of Yaron and Efrat Ungar, was released to Gaza as part of the Gilad Shalit prisoner exchange between Israel and Hamas.
