= Marc Zvi Brettler =

American biblical scholar

Marc Brettler (Marc Zvi Brettler) is an American biblical scholar, and the Bernice and Morton Lerner Professor in Judaic Studies at Duke University. He earned his B.A., M.A., and PhD from Brandeis University, where he was previously Dora Golding Professor of Biblical Studies. He researches biblical metaphors, the Bible and gender, biblical historical texts, the book of Psalms, and the post-biblical reception of the Hebrew Bible, including in the New Testament. He is a co-founder of the website thetorah.com, which integrates critical and traditional methods of studying the Bible.

In 2004, Brettler won the National Jewish Book Award for The Jewish Study Bible.

== Books ==
- The Bible With and Without Jesus: How Jews and Christians Read the Same Stories Differently, with Amy-Jill Levine, San Francisco: HarperOne, 2020. ISBN 978-0-06-256015-5
- The Bible and the Believer: How to Read the Bible Critically and Religiously, with Peter Enns and Daniel J. Harrington, New York: Oxford University Press, 2012 (reprint edition 2015). ISBN 978-0-19-021871-3
- The Jewish Annotated New Testament, with Amy-Jill Levine, New York: Oxford University Press, 2011 (second edition 2017). ISBN 978-0-19-046185-0
- How to Read the Bible, Philadelphia: Jewish Publication Society of America, 2005 (republished with minor revisions as How to Read the Jewish Bible, New York: Oxford University Press, 2007). ISBN 978-0-19-532522-5
- The Jewish Study Bible, with Adele Berlin, New York: Oxford University Press 2004 (second edition 2014). ISBN 978-0-19-997846-5
- The Book of Judges: Old Testament Readings, London: Routledge, 2001. ISBN 978-0-41-516217-3
- Biblical Hebrew for Students of Modern Hebrew, New Haven: Yale University Press, 2001. ISBN 978-0-30-008440-5
- The Creation of History in Ancient Israel, London: Routledge Press, 1995 (paperback 1998). ISBN 978-0-41-519407-5
- God is King: Understanding an Israelite Metaphor, Sheffield: Sheffield Academic Press, 1989 (republished 2009). ISBN 978-0-56-764081-9
