= Efrat Ungar =

- Born: אפרת אונגר; October 10, 1971; Jerusalem, Israel
- Died: June 9, 1996 (aged 24)
- Known for: Illustrator and writer of children's literature

Efrat (Efi) Ungar (Hebrew: אפרת אונגר; October 10, 1971 – June 9, 1996) was an Israeli illustrator and writer of children's literature. Unger and her husband were killed in a shooting attack by Palestinians on June 9, 1996.

== Biography ==
Efrat Ungar was born in Jerusalem to Judith and Rabbi Uri Dasberg. During her youth, her family moved to the Israeli settlement Alon Shvut located at the Etzion bloc. Later, Efrat studied in the "Tzvia" Ulpana and did Sherut Leumi (National Service) in Afula. After her national service, Efrat studied at the Emunah College in Jerusalem, and was trained as a graphic designer.

In 1993, Efrat married Yaron Ungar. The couple moved to Kiryat Arba, where Yaron served as an educator at Yeshiva Kiryat Arba (ישיבה תיכונית קריית ארבע). The couple had two sons – Dvir and Yishai.

For five years Unger worked as an illustrator and graphic designer in the children's section of the Israeli newspaper "HaTzofe", in which she regularly published a comics series.

=== Death ===
On June 9, 1996, Unger traveled with her husband and their baby son Yishai in the Kiryat Malachi – Beit Shemesh road (Route 383). When they drove near Moshav Gefen, Palestinian gunmen shot the vehicle and fled. Both Efrat and her husband were killed in the attack. Their son survived the attack unharmed.

== Aftermath ==
Efrat and Yaron were buried in the Kfar Etzion cemetery and their funeral was attended by thousands. In the site of the attack, a monument was erected, with the assistance of the Jewish National Fund, in memory of Efrat and Yaron Unger. Later on, a scholarship fund was established at Bar-Ilan University in their names and in their memory.

Efrat's two children, Dvir and Yishai, who were then one and two years old respectively, were transferred to the care of their maternal grandparents.

In 2000, Efrat's family filed a lawsuit in a U.S. federal court against Hamas and the Palestinian Authority. In 2003, the court ruled that the Hamas and the Palestinian Authority were liable for damages totaling $116 million for the murder of the couple. The Palestinian Authority appealed the decision but the appeal was rejected. In 2008, the District Court in Jerusalem confirmed the ruling of the U.S. Federal Court and ruled that it would also be enforceable in Israel as well.

Efrat's father, Rabbi Uri Dasberg, who in practice became the caregiver of Efrat's two children, was killed in a car accident in Gush Etzion on May 24, 2011.

== Her books ==
After her death, her family published her series of books:

- Dvir (דביר) – the book was written after the birth of her son, and called his name. It was initially published entirely, while she was still alive, in the "HaTzofe" newspaper.
- Dr. Tetanus (דוקטור טטנוס)
- Waiting for the Messiah (מחכים למשיח)
- Ran HaRachfan (רן הרחפן)
- Mouse Beware (עכבר היזהרה) – a short comic stories.

In addition, Efrat's father Rabbi Uri Dasberg published the Book of Ruth with illustrations made by Efrat.
