= Ora, Israel =

Ora: אוֹרָה (Hebrew)
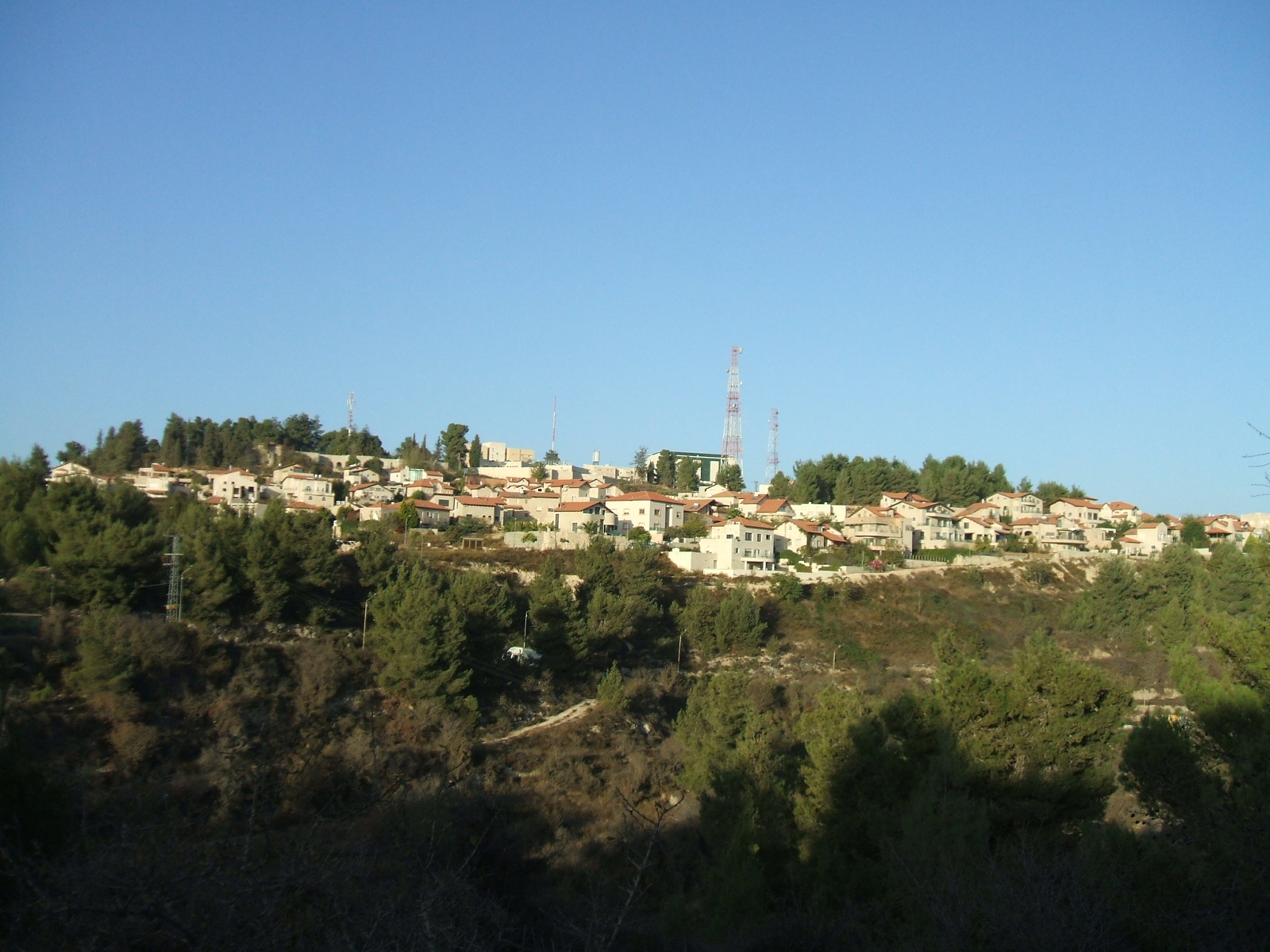
- Ora in 2007

- Location within Jerusalem District
- Coordinates: 31°45′15″N 35°9′13″E
- Country: Israel
- District: Jerusalem
- Council: Mateh Yehuda
- Affiliation: Moshavim Movement
- Founded: 1950
- Founder: Yemenite Jews
- Population (2024): 1,428

Ora (Hebrew: אוֹרָה, lit. 'Radiance') is a moshav in central Israel. Located southwest of Jerusalem, it falls under the jurisdiction of Mateh Yehuda Regional Council. In 2024 it had a population of 1,428.

== History ==
The village was established in 1950 by Jews from Yemen on land that had previously belonged to the depopulated Palestinian village of al-Jura before the 1948 Arab-Israeli War. The name "Ora" was taken from the Book of Esther 8:16: "For the Jews it was (a time of) radiance." The residents initially lived in tents and by 1954 only thirteen families remained. In 1953 Percy Newman, a British Jewish industrialist, donated money to the Jewish National Fund for the purchase of 3,000 dunams for the moshav. Several North African Jews later joined the moshav.

Residents were given tracts of land allocated for poultry farming and continued to live in tents, without running water or electricity, until 1957. Before the establishment of Kiryat HaYovel, the closest neighborhood was Beit VeGan, which was reached on foot or by donkey.

In the 1990s, after the wave of Russian immigration to Israel, the moshav increased egg production from 300 million to 500 million eggs a year.

Since the 27th of February 2025, the Red Line of the Jerusalem Light Rail stops at the entrance of the moshav at the Ora Junction station.

== Gallery ==
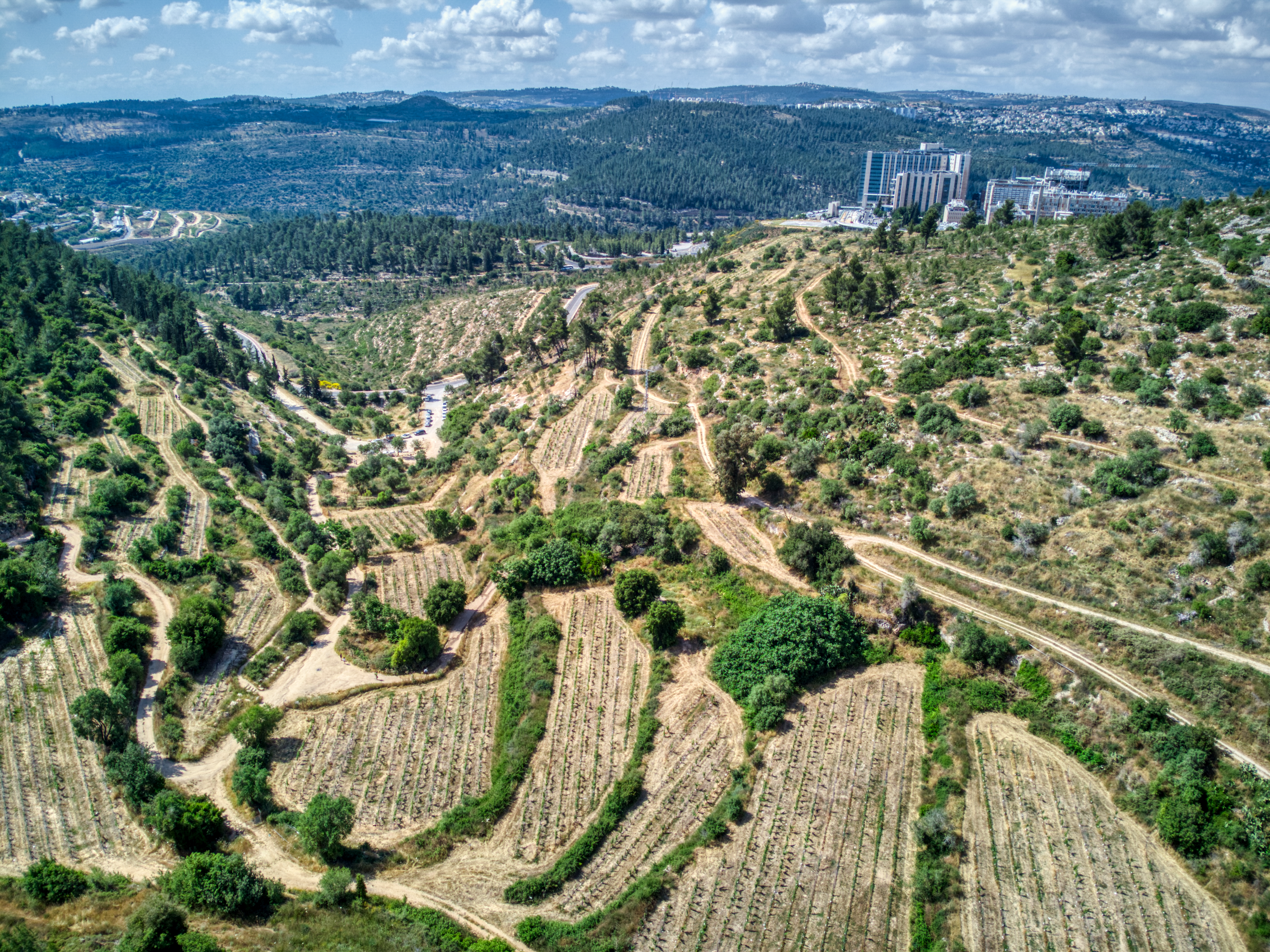
The view from Ora to Hadassah Medical Center. The al-Jura village was mainly on the right spur of the valley

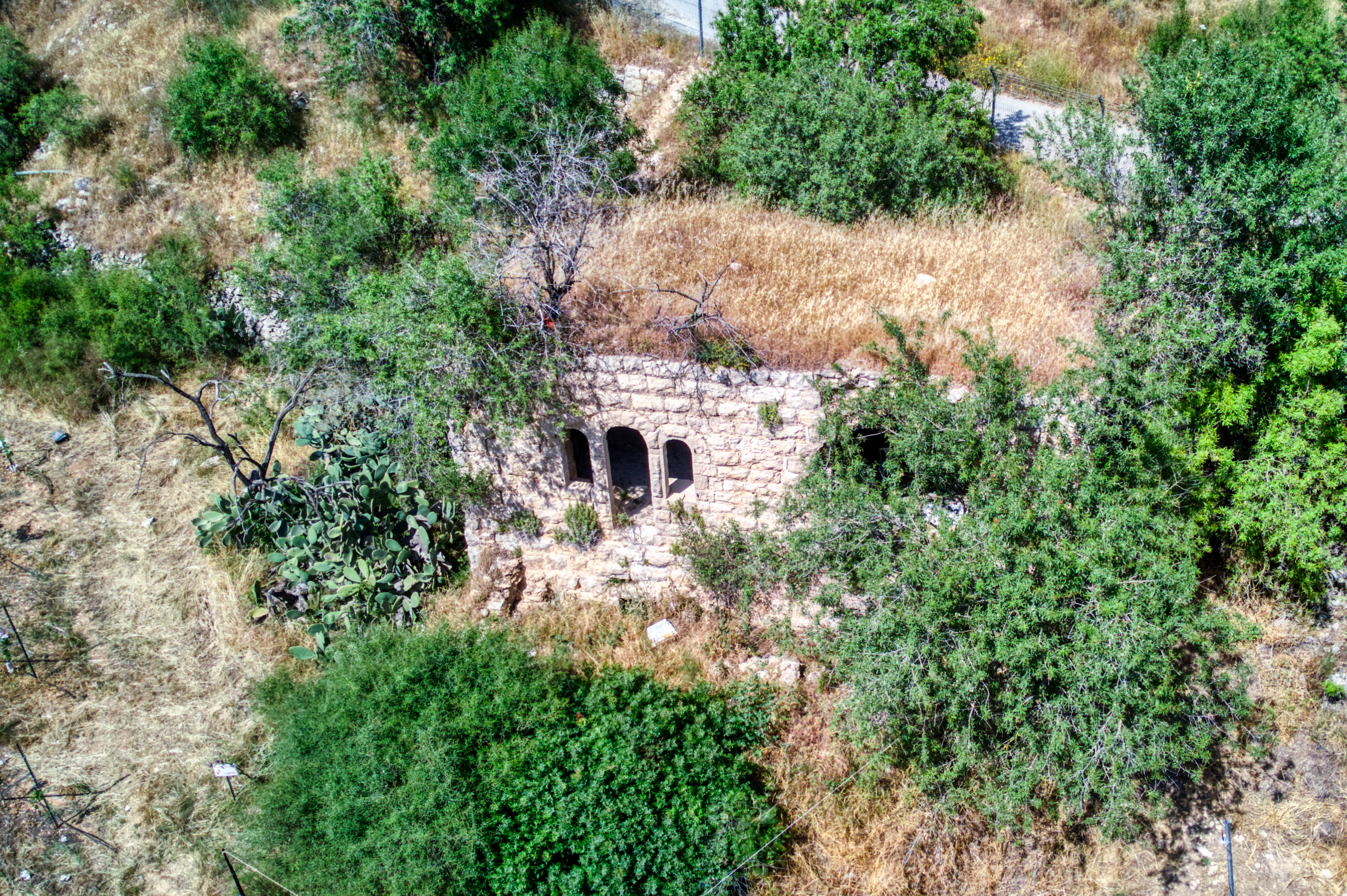
A ruined house, one of the last remains of al-Jura

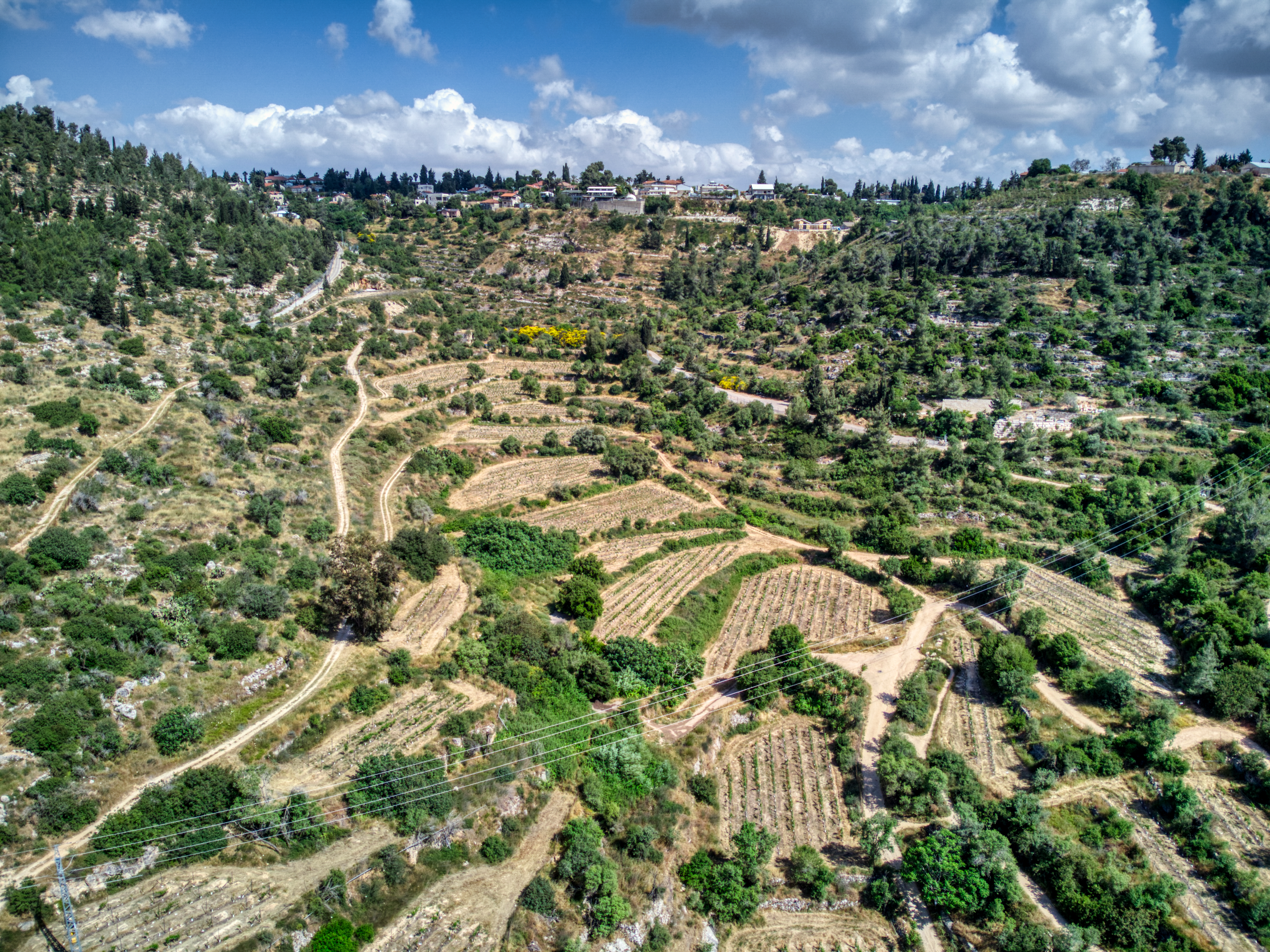
Ora and below of it the Ein Sarig valley

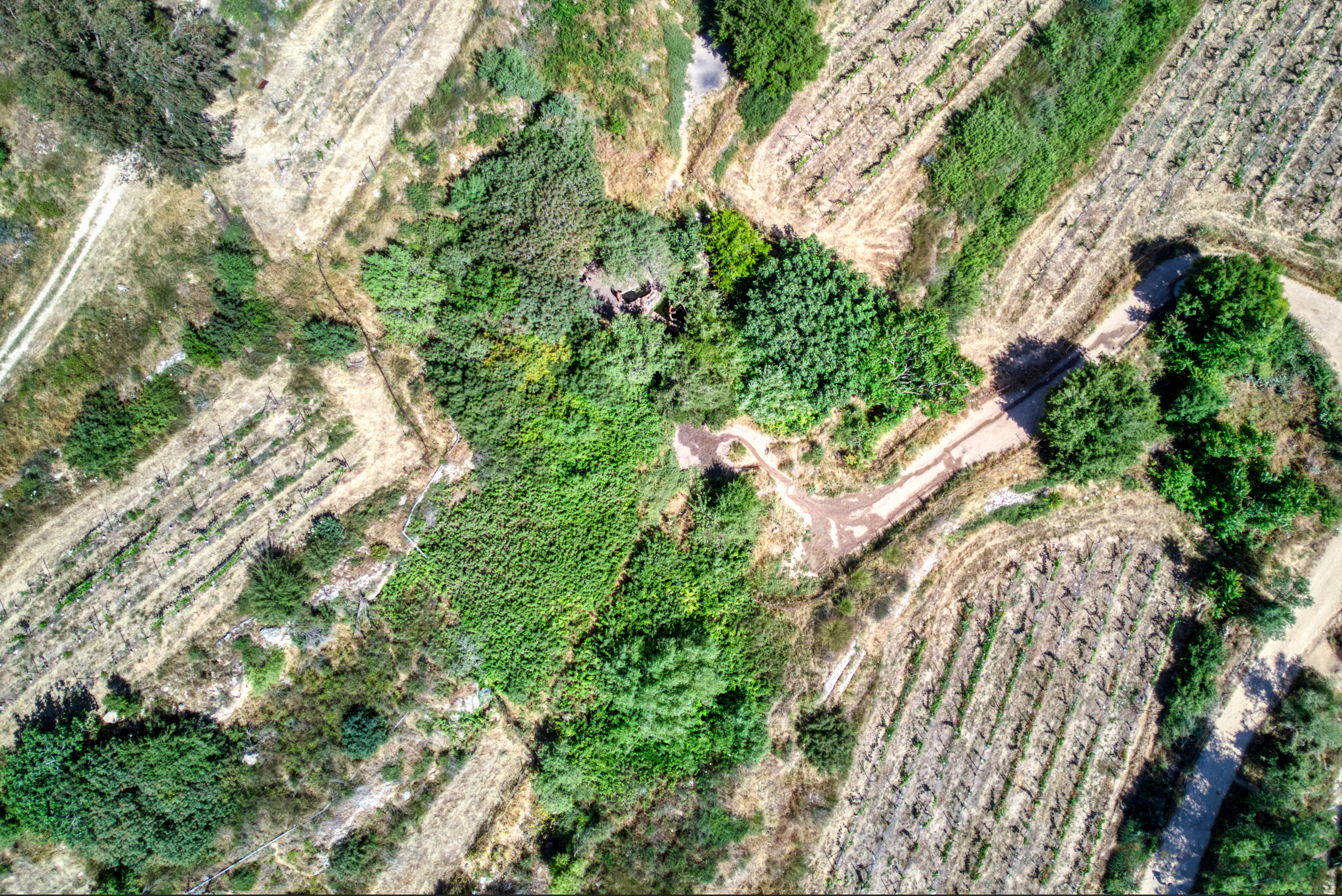
Ein Sarig from above
