= Adele Berlin =

American biblical scholar (born 1943)

- Born: Philadelphia, Pennsylvania
- Occupation: Biblical scholar
- Known for: Literary approach to the Bible
- Title: Robert H. Smith Professor Emerita of Biblical Studies
- Board member of: Past President of the Society of Biblical Literature, Fellow of the American Academy for Jewish Research

Academic background
- Education: University of Pennsylvania, Hebrew University of Jerusalem, Gratz College
- Thesis: Enmerkar and Ensuhkešdanna, A Sumerian Narrative Poem (1976)

Academic work
- Institutions: University of Maryland
- Main interests: Biblical narrative and poetry, and the interpretation of the Bible

Adele Berlin is an American biblical scholar and Hebraist. Before her retirement, she was Robert H. Smith Professor of Biblical Studies at the University of Maryland.

Berlin is best known for 1994 work Poetics and interpretation of biblical narrative (ISBN 1575060027). She has also written commentaries on Song of Songs, Zephaniah, Esther, and Lamentations. A Festschrift in her honor, "Built by Wisdom, Established by Understanding": Essays in Honor of Adele Berlin, was published in 2013.

Berlin has been a Guggenheim Fellow, and President of the Society of Biblical Literature. Along with Robert Alter and Meir Sternberg, Berlin is one of the most prominent practitioners of a literary approach to the Bible. In 2004, the Jewish Book Council awarded Berlin along with co-editor Marc Zvi Brettler the scholarship category award for the Jewish Publication Society and Oxford University Press book, The Jewish Study Bible. A decade later the two editors offered its second edition.

== Works ==
Multiple works published:-

=== Books ===
- Berlin, Adele (1979). Enmerkar and Ensuhkešdanna, A Sumerian Narrative Poem. Occasional Publications of the Babylonian Fund. Vol. 2. Philadelphia, PA: The University Museum. ISBN 9780934718295. OCLC 6090804.
- ——— (1983). Poetics and Interpretation of Biblical Narrative. Bible and literature series. Vol. 9. Sheffield, UK: Almond Press. ISBN 9780907459231. OCLC 10214708.
- ——— (1985). The Dynamics of Biblical Parallelism. Bloomington, IN: Indiana University Press. ISBN 9780253318503. OCLC 924981288.
- ——— (1991). Biblical Poetry Through Medieval Jewish Eyes. Indiana studies in biblical literature. Bloomington, IN: Indiana University Press. ISBN 9780585106120. OCLC 43475924.
- ——— (1994). Zephaniah: a new translation with introduction and commentary. Anchor Bible. Vol. 25A. New York: Doubleday. ISBN 9780385266314. OCLC 28928604.
- ——— (2001). Esther: the traditional Hebrew text with the new JPS translation. JPS Bible Commentary. Philadelphia, PA: Jewish Publication Society. ISBN 9780827606999. OCLC 44669511.
- ——— (2001). Esther. Miḳra le-Yiśraʼel Commentary. Tel Aviv: Am Oved. ISBN 9789651313257. OCLC 48838494.
- ——— (2002). Lamentations: A Commentary. Old Testament library. Louisville, KY: Westminster John Knox Press. ISBN 9780664218492. OCLC 49892430.
- [Jeffrey Tigay], and Adele Berlin, eds. The Posen Library of Jewish Culture and Civilization. Vol. 1, Ancient Israel, from Its Beginnings through 332 BCE. New Haven: Yale University Press, 2021. (Content available free digitally at posenlibrary.com)
- ——— (2023). The JPS Bible Commentary: Psalms 120–150. Jewish Publication Society. ISBN 9780827609402.
- ——— (2025). Song of Songs: A Commentary. Hermeneia. Minneapolis, MN: Fortress Press. ISBN 9780800699017. OCLC 1446262146.

=== Edited by ===
- ———; Brettler, Marc Zvi, eds. (2014). The Jewish Study Bible. Oxford & New York: Oxford University Press. ISBN 9780199978465. OCLC 892869165.
