= Negev Museum of Art =

Art museum in Israel

Coordinates: 31°14′29.71″N 34°47′18.19″E

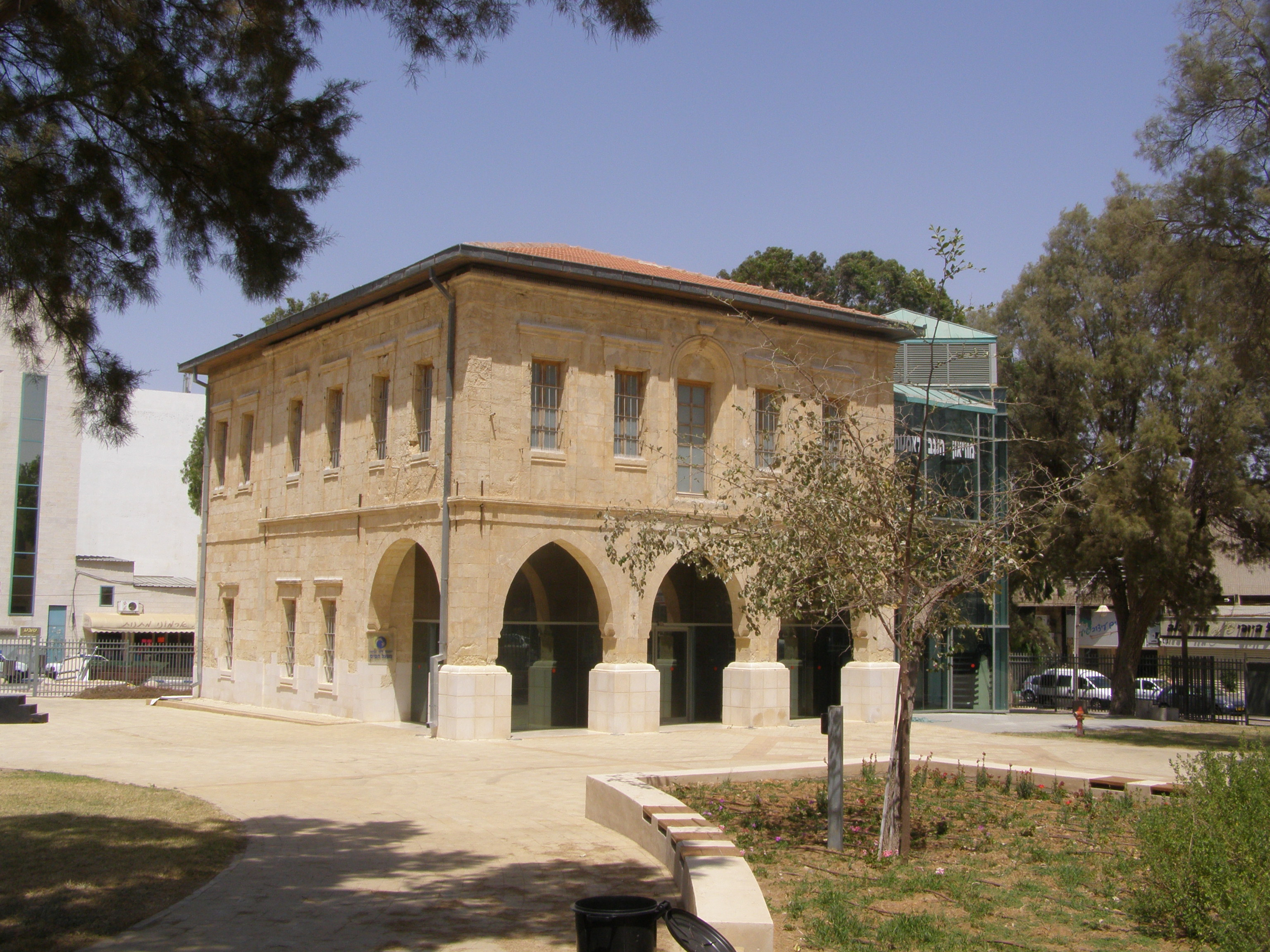
Negev Museum of Art, Beersheba

The Negev Museum of Art is an art museum in the Old City of Beersheba, Israel. The building is the former Governor's Mansion, built in 1906 by the Ottomans as part of government edifices that include the Seraya and the local mosque.

== Building ==
The two-floor building is a typical Ottoman “konak” house: the home of a governor or some other dignitaries, in which official meeting and receptions are held. Its facade has a four arched portico. During World War I the building housed the Officer of the British Staff and in 1938 it became a Bedouin girls school. Various modifications to the building were made during the British Mandate period, including adding an inner staircase and two rooms in the upper floor.

After the 1948 Arab–Israeli War, the building served the IDF. It turned to its civil use again after the foundation of the city of Be'er Sheva as the city's first municipality.

In the 1970s the municipality moved to its new building and the Governor's Mansion housed the art wing of the Negev Museum of Archaeology located in the nearby former Ottoman mosque. In 1998 the building was declared unsafe and was closed to the public.

A conservation process had begun, carried out by the conservation department of the antiquities' authority, led by architect Ze'ev Gur. The works adapted the building to modern museum requirements, including disabled accessibility and climate control, making it an officially recognized museum by Israel's Museum Council. The building was re-opened as the Negev Museum of Art in 2004.

== Museum ==
The museum is a municipal museum, and it has a collection of mostly modern Israeli art, including local and regional artists. In its early stages, as a wing of the Negev Museum of Archaeology, it displayed its permanent collection and occasional exhibitions. Since 1987, under the directorship of Noa Tal, the museum started to operate independently, displaying temporary exhibitions of Israeli and international art. During the 1990s, under the directorship of Galia Gavish, the museum expanded its collection, especially in ceramics and ethnographic works of Ethiopian Jews. Gavish also initiated an international Ceramics Biennial in Be'er Sheva.

During her time as director and curator (2002-2010) Noga Raved oversaw the renovation works and adaptation to museum standards. Among the exhibitions she curated were a duo exhibition of Michael Gross and Ori Reisman (2006), and "60-90-60" (2008), a historical exhibition to mark the 60th anniversary of Israeli Be'er Sheva and the 90th anniversary of the city's conquest by Australian and New Zealand Army Corps (ANZAC) during World War I, thus starting the end of the Ottoman rule of Palestine.

In 2011 the museum became part of Kivunim Company of leisure culture in Be'er Sheva with its new director and curator, art historian Dr Dalia Manor. The museum has run an intensive program of exhibitions of major Israeli artists and of international artists. The first of these was the group show Southern Spirit: Aspects of the Negev in Contemporary Israeli Art. Among the participating artists were Michal Rovner, Roi Kuper, Gilad Ophir, Gilad Efrat, Pavel Wolberg and others. Following its success, the exhibition travelled to Tel Aviv University Gallery and is scheduled to travel to Germany. The following exhibition was dedicated to celebrated Israeli painter and sculptor Menashe Kadishman, showing prints, sculptures and paintings, some exhibited for the first time. The year ended with an international exhibition of paper art, In Between, that travelled from the Wilfrid Israel Museum in Kibbutz Hazorea that organised it. As part of this exhibition the Negev Museum included a homage to Joyce Schmidt, who founded in Be'er Sheva the first paper mill and initiated the paper making art in Israel. During this exhibition the education programs of the museum expanded to include regular creative workshops offered to children in addition to guided tours for the public.

In 2012 the first ever exhibition from the private collection of Hillela Tal of Israeli art was opened at the Negev Museum of Art, with works by renowned artists Moshe Gershuni, Moshe Kupferman, Lea Nikel, Buky Schwartz, Nahum Tevet, Igael Tumarkin, Aviva Uri, and others. It was followed by a solo show of Sigalit Landau, 'Caryatid', consisting of installations, sculptures and video and sound works. In 2013 the museum exhibited a solo show of photographs by internationally renowned artist Micha Bar-Am consisting of photos taken in the south of Israel from the 1950s to the 2000s. In October 2013, to mark the 40th anniversary of the Yom Kippur War a historic group exhibition on the theme of memory and bereavement in Israeli art was opened. Among the participating artists were Yigal Tumarkin, Menachem Shemi, Ludwig Blum, David Reeb, David Wakstein, Asad Azi, Zvika Kantor, Erez Yisraeli, and others. In 2014 the museum exhibited group shows: one on the theme of the desert by Israeli and international artists, "On Dray Land", and an exhibition of Pop art prints by major American and British artists from the collection of the Israel Museum, Jerusalem. The last exhibition of the year was dedicated to the 50th anniversary of the Monument to the Negev Brigade combining a solo show of Dani Karavan, the Monument creator, and a group show of other artists who photographed it or were inspired by it, among them Yaacov Agor and Yael Bartana. The exhibition was accompanied by live events on the site of the monument and an international symposium held at the Ben-Gurion University of the Negev.

During summers the Negev Museum of Art hosts open-air musical events on its ground.

== See also ==
- Visual arts in Israel
