= Gilad Efrat =

Israeli painter (born 1969)

Gilad Efrat גלעד אפרת
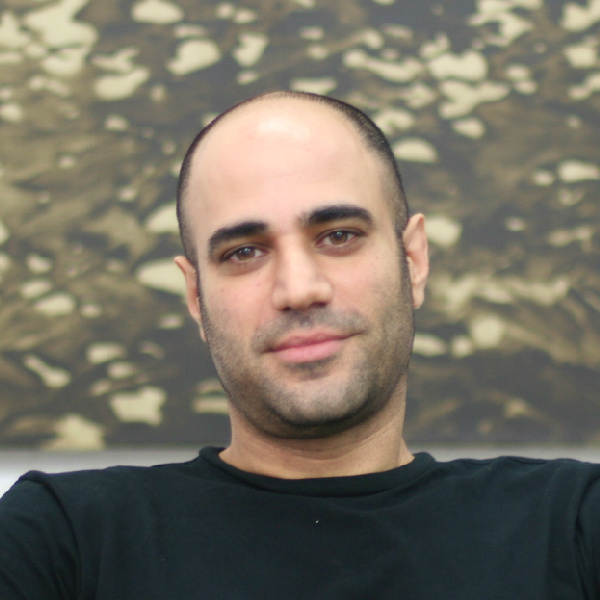
- Efrat in 2009
- Born: 11 July 1969 (age 57); Beersheba, Israel
- Education: Bezalel Academy of Arts and Design; The Hebrew University of Jerusalem
- Known for: Painting

Gilad Efrat (Hebrew: גלעד אפרת; born 11 July 1969) is an Israeli contemporary painter and university teacher. He is a professor at the Shenkar College of Engineering and Design, Israel.

== Biography ==
Gilad Efrat was born in 1969 in Beersheba, Israel. In 1995 he completed his BA in the Bezalel Academy of Arts and Design in Jerusalem. In 1997 he presented his first solo exhibition in Hakibutz Gallery for Israeli art in Tel Aviv and has since participated in numerous solo and group exhibitions at museums and galleries around the world, including in Austria, Italy, Bosnia and Herzegovina, Germany, Denmark, Texas, New York City, Scotland, and Philadelphia.

in 2003 he completed his MFA in the joint program of Bezalel Academy of Art and Design and the Hebrew University of Jerusalem. In 2004, he participated in the Core Residency program at the Museum of Fine Arts, Houston, Texas, which included a two-year residency and a creative practice scholarship.

Since 2008, Efrat has been a senior lecturer at the Shenkar College of Engineering and Design in Ramat-Gan, in the Multidisciplinary Art Department. In 2018 he received a professorship by the Council for Higher Education. He previously taught also at Rice University in Houston, Texas, and in the Department of Art at the Bezalel Academy of Art and Design.

Efrat was most recently the subject of a large-scale solo exhibition at The Israel Museum, titled Gilad Efrat: Inside Painting, which opened July 16, 2019, and ran through January 4, 2020.

He lives and works in Tel-Aviv.

== His works ==
Efrat's works deal mainly with questions of the language of painting and the representation of landscape as a geopolitical space through which identity and consciousness are constituted. The painting method he developed is based on covering the canvas with layers of paint, and then exposing the image by erasing the paint.

His works alternate between the "figurative" and the "abstract" and between landscapes and portraits. They present pictorial conceptions of the history of time and memory, in images which include archaeological sites, ruins of European cities, arid spaces of his hometown of Beersheba, the deserts of Mars and lunar valleys. His works also include self-portraits and portraits of apes. With his unique painting technique, the canvas turns into a kind of archaeological mound of layers of testimonies and erasures, documenting personal biography and local histories.

From the beginning of his artistic career in the 1990s, Efrat dealt with the historical and political complexity of the landscape. While using his technique, based on wiping layers of paint, he consistently examines systems of interrelationships between painting and photography and focuses on questions of consciousness – universal and also local. His interest in local archaeological sites in the beginning of his career, steams from a desire to represent the artist's identity and relation to Israel.

Efrat went on to paint landscapes of ruined cities, swamps, Tamarix trees and landscapes of the moon and Mars.

During the time he lived in Texas he began painting apes at the Houston Zoo. As part of a fundraising campaign for the zoo, those apes were given drawing tools and painted abstract paintings, intended for sale at auction. Inspired by their act, Efrat began to abandon the painting based on the visible reality, and turned to the abstract painting and to the preoccupation with color, stain, line and the internal relations within the painting. He created detailed portraits of the monkeys that caused the turning point in his work. These portraits mark a significant moment in Efrat's transition to abstraction. They address the tension between the figurative and the abstract, and the cerebral and the intuitive.The portraits were displayed at the Israel Museum in 2019 as well as at the "Monkey View" exhibition at the Ein Harod Arts Center in 2010.

Efrat's abstract paintings consist of smears of paint in large movements, but with the memory of an image. In other words: in his abstract paintings, the image has not been completely lost, and fits into the general abstraction of the work. In addition, Efrat is always engaged in photography, and even in his most abstract works he does not omit the reference to photography, and in many cases, even highlights the complete contrast between accurate photography and abstract processed painting.

In 2019 Efrat presented his first solo exhibition at the Israel Museum. The exhibition featured a very large range of works spanning over 20 years of activity. The exhibition dealt with the interplay between a "figurative" painting based on a photograph and an "abstract" painting.

In the series of paintings by Efrat, "Ansar", based on photographs by the photographer Roy Cooper between the years 2004 and 2011, Efrat erases the desert environment of the "Ansar 3" prison (also known as "Ketziot") in the Negev, leaving the structure of the facility seen. The series consists of 12 drawings made according to negatives. etziot is the largest detention facility in Israel, and it was built during the First Intifada in 1988 to arrest and interrogate Palestinian detainees. The facility was full during the first and Second Intifadas and completely abandoned in the period between them, when the photos of Cooper were taken. Efrat cleared the image from the photos, leaving only the walls and fences, thereby creating a surreal space that detaches from the present. He created the paintings in his typical method, applying layers of paint and wiping them to create an image.

== Selected solo exhibitions ==
- 2019 – Gilad Efrat: Inside Painting, the Israel Museum, Jerusalem; (curator: Amitai Mendelsohn) (cat.)
- 2017 – Resurface, Inman Gallery, Houston, Texas
- 2016 – Gilad Efrat: Paintings, 2014–2016, The Michel Kikoïne Prize, Genia Schreiber University Gallery, Tel Aviv University (curator: Irit Tal) (cat.)
- Thinking Path, Loushy Art & Projects, Tel Aviv
- 2015 – Sandwalk, Inman Gallery, Houston, Texas
- 2012 – Negev, Inman Gallery, Houston, Texas
- 2014 – Recent Works, (two person exhibition with Michael Jones McKean), Special Projects, Untitled Art Fair, Miami
- 2010 – Ape Scape, Museum of Art, Ein Harod, Israel (curator: Galia Bar Or) (cat.)
- 2008 – Common Place, Oredaria Gallery of Contemporary Art, Rome
- Common Space, Inman Gallery, Houston, Texas
- 2006 – New Paintings, Inman Gallery, Houston, Texas
- 2004 – No Man's Land, Oredaria Gallery of Contemporary Art, Rome, Italy (cat.)
- Archaeological Site, St. Augustine Church, Erfurt, Germany (curator: Rudolf Grass)
- Noga Gallery of Contemporary Art, Tel Aviv
- 2002 – New Paintings, Noga Gallery of Contemporary Art, Tel Aviv
- Portraits, Oranim Institute Gallery, Israel (curators: David Wakstein and students)
- 2001 – City 2001, (two person exhibition with Etti Abergel), Nachshon Gallery
- Kibutz Nachshon, Israel (curator: Yael Kainy)
- 2000 – New Paintings, Noga Gallery of Contemporary Art, Tel Aviv
- 1998 – Surface, Herzliya Museum of Art, Herzliya, Israel (curator: Dalia Levin) (cat.)
- The Reminiscence of the Desirable, North Gallery, Copenhagen, Denmark (brochure)
- 1997 – History and Destruction In the Landscape of Israel, Hakibbutz Gallery, Tel Aviv (curator: Tali Tamir)
- 1996 – Studios in the Shelter, Shelter gallery space, Jerusalem
- 1995 – Installation-Morasha-Musrara, The Morasha Art Center Gallery, Jerusalem (curator: Alex Kremer)

== Awards ==
- 1993 – Mushik Ben Dor Prize for Contribution to Culture
- 1994 – Herman Struck Prize for Printing, Bezalel Academy of Arts and Design, Jerusalem
- 1997 – Young Artist Award, Israeli Ministry of Education and Culture
- 1999/1998 – The Sharett Foundation Fellowship for Painting, America-Israel Cultural Foundation
- 2001 – The Lily Richmond Purchase Foundation Prize, Tel Aviv Museum of Art, Tel Aviv
- 2005 – George and Janet Jaffin Prize for Excellence in Plastic Arts, America-Israel Cultural Foundation
- 2006 – Artadia Grant, The Fund for Art and Dialogue, Brooklyn, NY, USA
- 2007 – Grant, The Pollock-Krasner Foundation, New York City, US
- 2012 – Prize in Visual Arts, Ministry of Culture and Sport
- 2015 – Michel Kikoine Prize for Israeli Painting, Tel-Aviv University

== See also ==
Visual arts in Israel
