= Uri Tzaig =

Israeli artist

Uri Tzaig (Hebrew: אורי צאיג; born 1965) is an Israeli artist.

Tzaig was born in Qiryat Gat.

With a background in theater, he works often in multimedia, video, and installations.

His art and installations have been shown at the Centre Georges Pompidou, Paris, Institute of Visual Arts, Milwaukee, MASS MoCA, North Adams, Massachusetts, and other major international museums. He currently lives in Israel.

In 2008, Tzaig was appointed as the headmaster of the textile design faculty in the Shenkar College of Engineering and Design.
