= Efrat Shvily =

Israeli photographer (born 1955)

Efrat Shvily (Hebrew: אפרת שוילי; born 1955) is an Israeli artist based in Jerusalem. She has exhibited her work in the 50th Venice Biennale and the 8th International Istanbul Biennial, both in 2003.

== Overview ==
Shvily has had many international solo exhibitions and has participated in group exhibition in the USA, Europe, and elsewhere.

Her work, influenced by her occupation as a journalist and education in political science, has been mainly focused on Israeli occupation of Palestinian territories and the different aspects of the Israeli–Palestinian conflict. Most notable in this theme as well as Shvily's career are two series: "New Homes In Israel And The Occupied Territories" – A series of photographs documenting "Anonymous deserted buildings", Arabic houses, in occupied territories; and "Palestinian Cabinet Ministers" – A series of portraits of all the Palestinian government ministers.

In recent years Shvily has been focused on video as her main artistic medium, most recently producing the show "The Jerusalem Experience" which was exhibited in Graz, Austria and in Geneva, Switzerland.

== Solo exhibitions ==
- 2017, The Jerusalem Experience, Centre de la photographie, Geneva
- 2015, The Jerusalem Experience, Camera Austria, Graz.
- 2014, Jasmine Fruit, Galerie Martine & Thibault de La Châtre, Paris
- 2013, Point/Counterpoint: Efrat Shvily, Works 1992-2012, Museum of Art, Ein Harod
- 2010, The Bride, Galerie Martine & Thibault de La Châtre, Paris
- 2006, Solo Exhibition, Espace Arts Plastiques Venissieux, Septembre de la Photographie, Lyon
- 2005, Have No Fear At All, Musrara Community Gallery, Jerusalem
- 2004, 21 MOIS DES 3 MONDES, Theatre de L'Agora et La Maison du Monde d'Évry, Évry
- 2004, SA'HKI SA'HKI, Sommer Contemporary Art, Tel Aviv.
- 2002, Solo Exhibition, Center de la photographie, Geneva
- 1995, Solo Exhibition, Herzliya Museum, Herzliya.

== "New Homes In Israel And The Occupied Territories" ==
In this project Efrat Shvily presents a series of scenery photographs showing abandoned or unoccupied houses and buildings, all of which located either on Israeli or Palestinian territory. The buildings, some old, some new, are unaccounted for, unexplained by the artist, presented as they are "barren, devoid of human presence, abandoned and neglected". Their ghost-like presence alludes to the power struggle and political tensions in the area. The two mediums of architecture and photography enact a battle between change and memory, as Shvily's own documentation of the buildings – political tools and means, as well as ends within themselves – takes on the role of a political act. The photographs attempt to both salvage what is lost in the Palestinian territories, while exposing the unnaturalness, the strangeness of the new settlement – and all of this is done within a blur, not distinguishing between the two types of structures in any formal way.
