= Efrat Peled =

Israeli business executive

- אפרת פלד
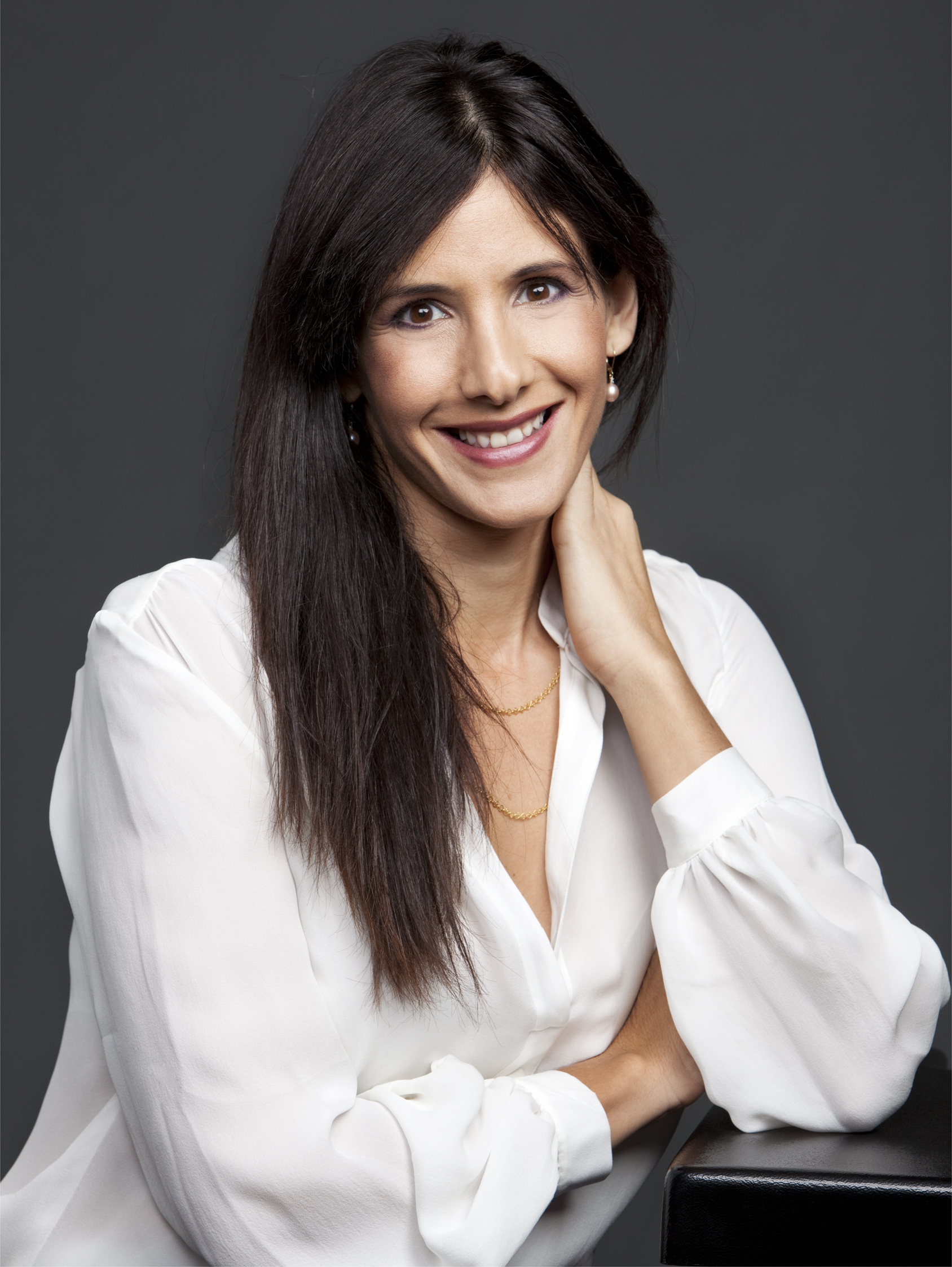
- Peled in 2010
- Occupation: CEO

Efrat Peled (Hebrew: אפרת פלד; born 1974, Israel) is the chairman and CEO of Arison Investments and the CEO of SAFO (Shari Arison Family Office, Miami, US).

== Early life and career ==
Peled serves as chairman and CEO of Arison Investments, and as CEO of SAFO (Shari Arison Family Office) in Miami, US, responsible for managing all of Arison's businesses, estimated at billions of dollars. She also serves as an international board member of the Weizmann Institute. Peled is a former board member at Bank Hapoalim, Israel's leading bank, a former member of the board at Shikun & Binui, Israel's leading infrastructure and real estate company, a former member of the board at Salt of the Earth, Israel's leading salt producer, a former member of the board at Miya, a global water efficiency company, a former member of the board at The Ted Arison Family Foundation. and a former member of the advisory committee to the Israeli government's National Economic Council.

Peled holds an Executive Masters of Business Administration from Kellogg-Recanati, a joint international program of both Northwestern and Tel Aviv Universities. She also holds a BA in Accounting and Economics from Tel Aviv University, a postgraduate diploma in Real Estate Appraisal and Management from Tel Aviv University, and is a Certified Public Accountant (CPA).

== Awards and accolades ==
Forbes Israel repeatedly ranked Peled one of the Most Powerful Women in Israel. Listed No. 9 in 2015, No. 8 in 2014, and No. 6 in 2013.

Two years in a row she was ranked on Fortune's 50 Most Powerful Women in Business, No. 50 in 2012, and No. 44 in 2011, and was listed on Fortune's 10 Global Women on the Rise in 2011.

In 2012, Peled was honored Executive of the Year - Conglomerates by Stevie International Business Awards, and in 2013 she received the Northwestern University Alumni Merit Award, from Kellogg School of Management, honoring her for her outstanding professional and personal achievements in business. She was the first-ever Israeli honored this prestigious recognition, granted so far mostly to Americans.

Peled is a former member of the World Economic Forum. She is also a former member the Clinton Global Initiative LEAD group (since 2010), a flagship program that brings together a select group of twenty accomplished young leaders from around the globe, to develop innovative solutions for some of the world's most pressing challenges.
