= Shenkar College of Engineering, Design and Art =

College in Ramat Gan, Israel

Coordinates: 32°5′22.95″N 34°48′7.44″E

- שנקר - הנדסה, עיצוב ואמנות
- Type: Public college
- Established: 1970
- President: Sheizaf Rafaeli
- Students: 2,942
- Location: Ramat Gan, Tel Aviv District, Israel
- Campus: Urban
- Website: shenkar.ac.il

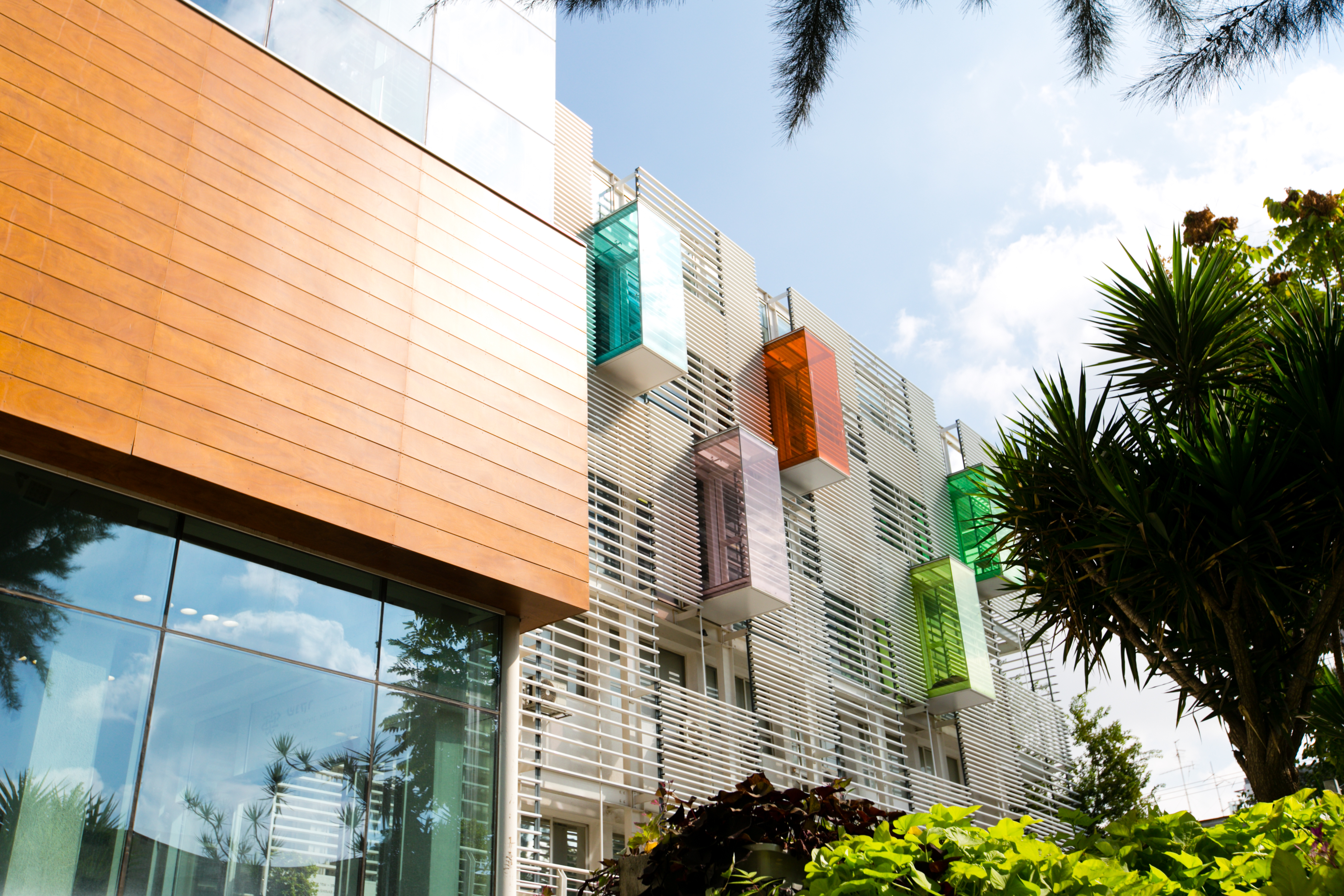
Shenkar Frenic Building

Shenkar College of Engineering, Design and Art (commonly abbreviated as Shenkar) is a public college in the Tel Aviv District city of Ramat Gan, Israel. Shenkar serves the Israeli industry by providing academic qualification and R&D services for modern industries. Shenkar is also considered as the top design school in Israel.

== History ==
Shenkar was established in 1970, with the goal of serving Israeli industry. The college is named after Arie Shenkar, founder and first president of the Manufacturers Association of Israel (formerly Industrialists' Union in The Land of Israel) and a pioneer in the Israeli textile industry. Shenkar has three faculties: Multidisciplinary Art, Design and Engineering. Shenkar faculties offer four-year undergraduate degrees, taught in Hebrew. The design and the engineering faculties offer postgraduate degrees in design and in plastics engineering, respectively.

Shenkar is accredited by the Council for Higher Education in Israel as an institute of higher education and its three faculties are authorized to award bachelor's degrees in Fine Arts, design and engineering. The school, in cooperation with Israel's Industry, Trade and Labor Ministry and National Institute for Technological Training, operates a Practical Engineering school, which is located in Tel Aviv, outside of Shenkar's main campus.

According to Fashionista magazine, Shenkar is ranked 15th in "The Top 50 Fashion Schools In The World" list, as of 2010.

== Classroom and research facilities ==
The main campus, in Ramat Gan, consists mainly of two buildings. First, is the Frances and David Pernick Building. The Pernick Building was the first building that Shenkar occupied when the college was established in 1970. Back then, the building was an ORT high-school building that was no longer in use. In 1990, the building was renamed in honor of Frances and David Pernick. The second building is the Edward D. and Anna Mitchell Building. It was inaugurated in 2002 and built with the help of the Mitchell Foundation, the Lorber family and the Manufacturers Association of Israel. The seven-story building, which also has two underground levels, houses classrooms, and seminar rooms for design and engineering.

- Shenkar's research facilities:
  - Rose Archive for Textiles and Costumes
  - Kadar Design and Technology Center
  - The Edelstein Center for the Analysis of Ancient Artifacts
  - The Joe Weinstein Center for Research in Medical textiles
  - Textile Testing Laboratories
  - Design Research Center
  - Rapid Prototype Center
  - Nanotechnology Center
  - Center for Nonwovens
  - Green Design & Technologies
- Other facilities are:
  - The Shenkar Forum for Culture and Society
  - CIM Laboratory
  - The Sidney & Anita Bernstein Library

== Student union ==
Shenkar's Student Association is an independent, self-governing student body. Members also belong to the National Union of Israeli Students and benefit from all the advantages afforded to students in Israel and abroad. Shenkar offers students diversified financial support in sports, cultural, educational and social programs.

== Alumni ==
The Alumni Association of Shenkar was founded in 2009 as a non-profit organization. Its goal is to aid the alumni by creating a connection array, which would support joint interests, continuing business success and the empowerment of Shenkar's alumni reputation.

=== Notable alumni ===
- Inbal Dror
- Alber Elbaz
- Hila Klein
- Nili Lotan
- Roy Efrat

== Notable faculty ==
- Uri Tzaig
- Yigal Zalmona
- Mel Rosenberg

== Faculties and Departments ==
Shenkar is accredited as an institution of higher education and is authorized to award the following degrees:

- Engineering faculty (awards with B.Sc. or M.Sc. degree)
  - Bachelor of Science in Software Engineering
  - Bachelor of Science in Industrial Engineering and Management
  - Bachelor of Science and Master of Science in Plastics Engineering
  - Bachelor of Science in Chemical Engineering
  - Bachelor of Science in Electronics Engineering
- Department of Multidisciplinary Art
  - Bachelor of Fine Arts in Multidisciplinary Art.
- The Azrieli Faculty Of Design (awards with B.Des. degree or M.Des. Degree)
  - Bachelor of Design in Textile Design
  - Bachelor of Design in Fashion Design
  - Bachelor of Design in Jewelry Design
  - Bachelor of Design in Industrial Design
  - Bachelor of Design in Interior - Building and Environment Design
  - Bachelor of Design in Visual Communication
  - Master of Design in Design

== See also ==
- Education in Israel
- List of universities and colleges in Israel
