= CaixaForum =

CaixaForum is a series of museums, galleries and exhibition centres sponsored by Catalan not-for-profit banking foundation La Caixa.

It has the following locations:

- CaixaForum Barcelona
- CaixaForum Madrid
- CaixaForum Lleida
- CaixaForum Palma
- CaixaForum Tarragona
- CaixaForum Zaragoza
- CaixaForum Sevilla
- CaixaForum Valencia
