= Gran Hotel (Palma) =

Former hotel in Palma, Spain

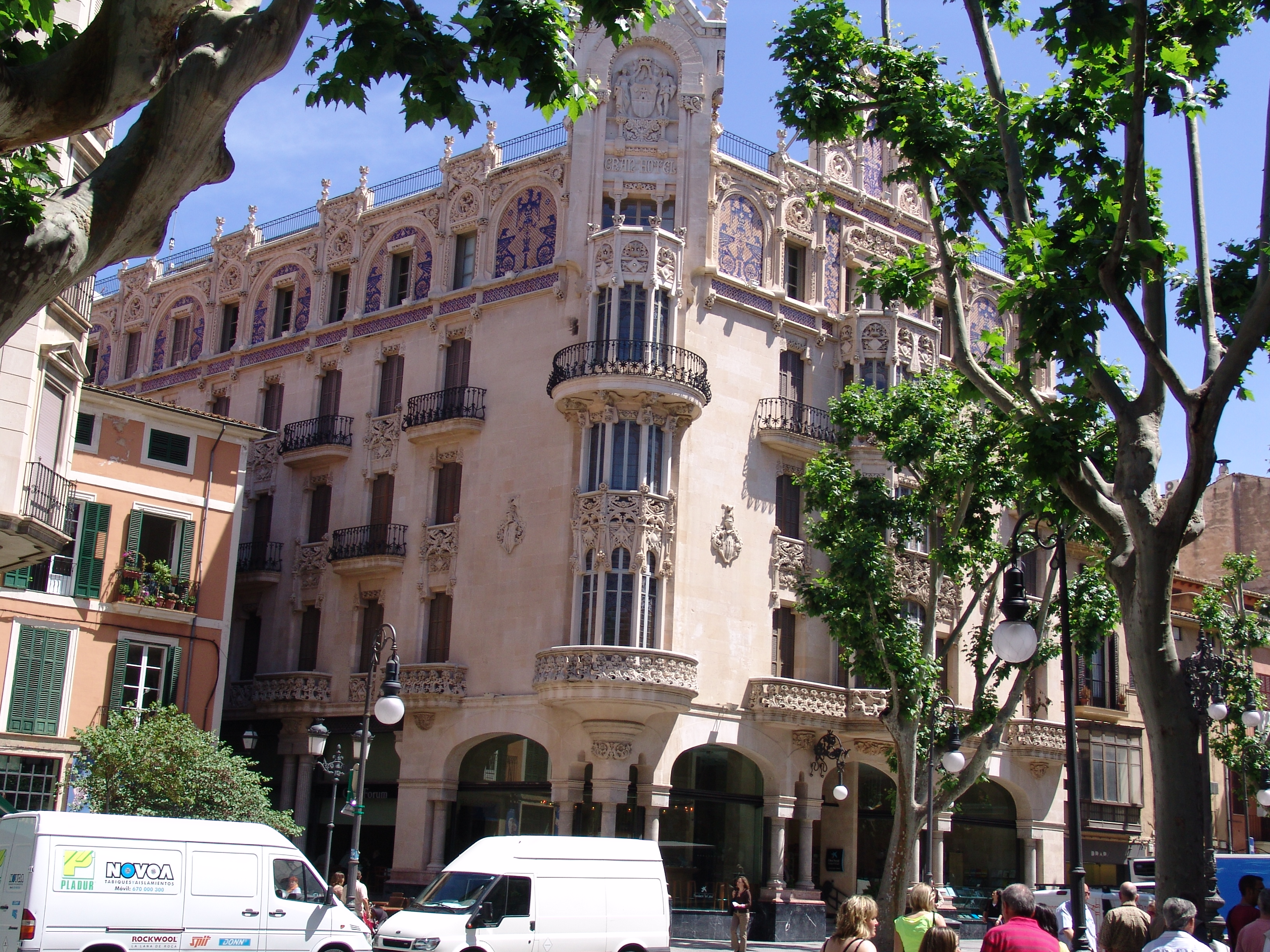

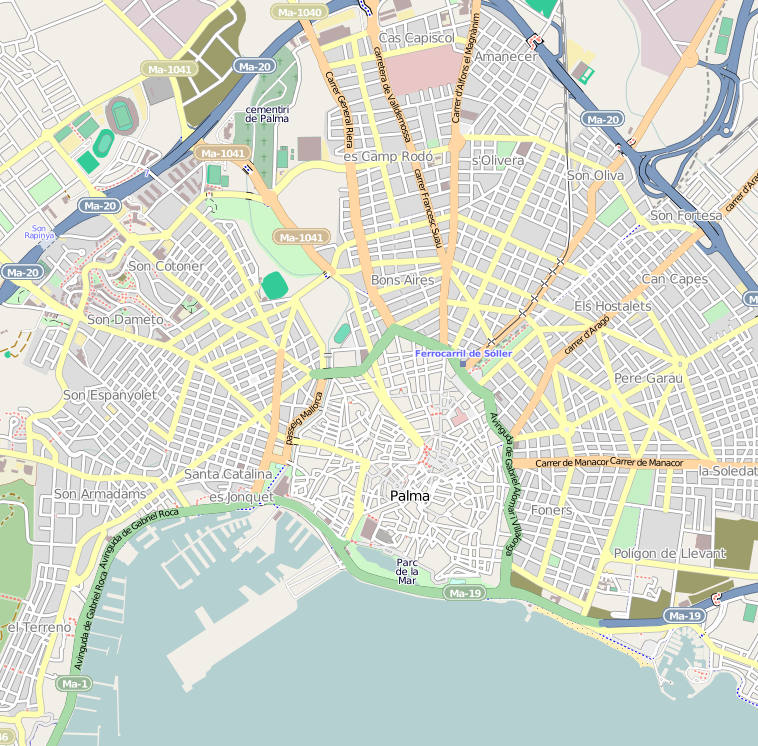
- Location within Palma de Mallorca

General information
- Location: 33 Plaza Weyler, Palma de Mallorca, Majorca, Balearic Islands, Spain.
- Coordinates: 39°34′18″N 2°38′59″E
- Opening: 1903

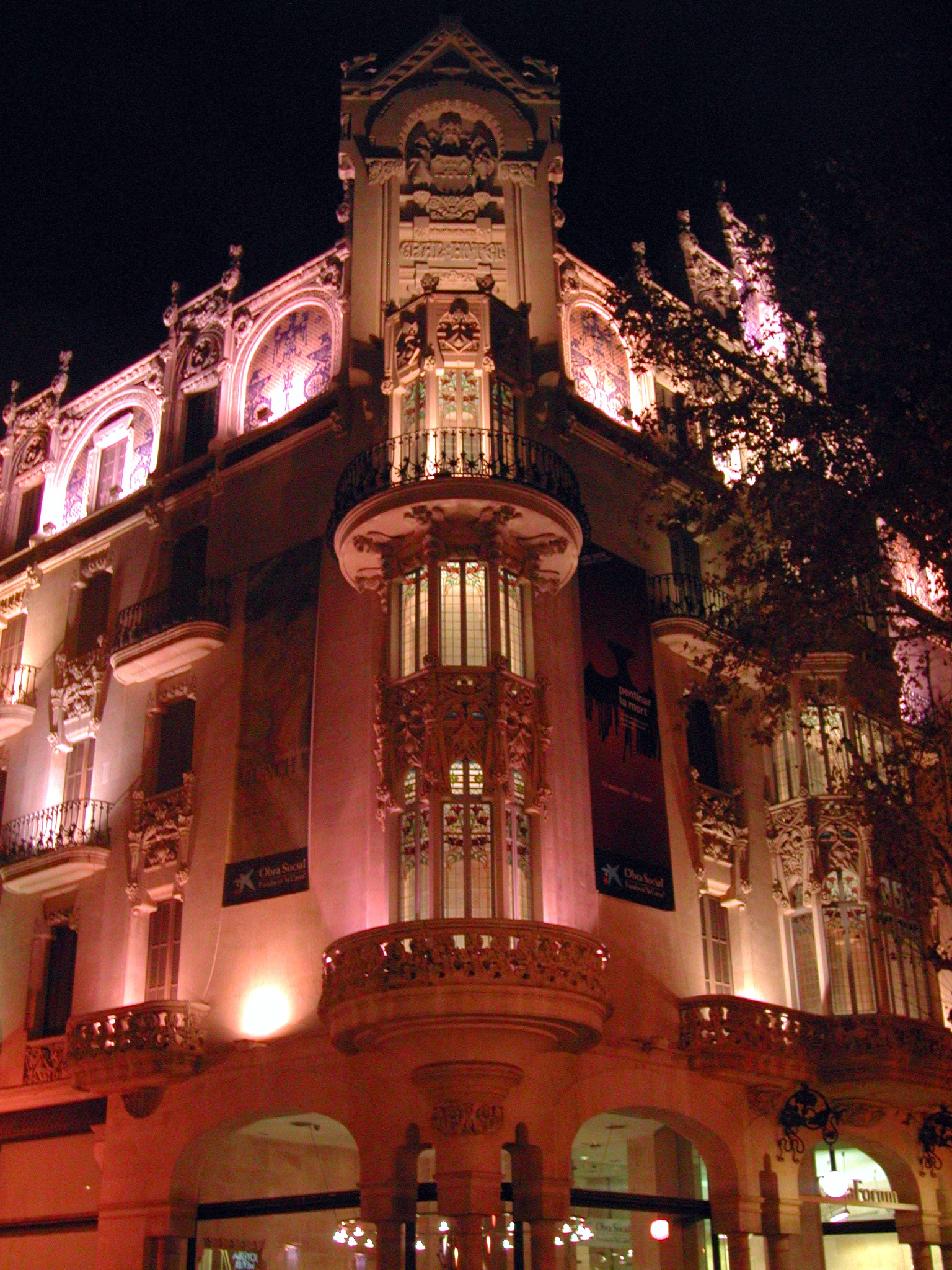
Gran Hotel Exterior

The Gran Hotel is a former historic hotel located in Plaza Weyler, in Palma, the capital of Mallorca, the largest of the Balearic Islands. It is part of the historic centre of the city. The building opened as a CaixaForum, one of a chain of artistic venues run by banking group La Caixa in 1993.

== History ==
The hotel was designed by Lluís Domènech i Montaner and completed in 1903. It was the first building on the island to have a telephone and electricity supply. Today the building has been converted into a cultural center, home to the Fundación la Caixa. It contains a permanent exhibition of paintings by Anglada Camarasa. The building is noted for its use of brick, together with wrought iron and glazed ceramics, with the use of floral motifs and ceramic tiles. The building is one of the most important examples of Modernisme on the island, with a facade lavishly decorated with sculptures and ceramics.

Due to events such as the Spanish Civil War (1936-1939) and World War II (1939-1945), the hotel closed its doors in 1941 and was acquired the following year by the State to house the Instituto Nacional de Previsión. The hotel underwent major modifications, disfiguring the first floor with partitions and making the arcades and columns disappear. These modifications caused it to lose its avant-garde and, at the same time, Catalanist architectural character. The building was declared a site of cultural interest by the Ministerio de Cultura (Spain) in 2003 due to its faithful restoration and architectural interest.

The building opened as a CaixaForum, one of a chain of artistic venues run by banking group La Caixa in 1993.
