= Technological Corporation of Andalusia =

Public-private partnership R&D complex in Andalusia, Spain

The Technological Corporation of Andalusia (Corporación Tecnológica de Andalucía, CTA) is a public-private partnership in the autonomous community of Andalusia, Spain, linking scientific and industrial innovation. The project was publicly launched on 27 July 2005, and the official act constituting it was put into effect 10 October 2005. As of 2026, its president is Beltrán Pérez García.

It is a private foundation promoted by the Council of Innovation, Science and Business of the Autonomous Government of Andalusia (Spanish: Consejería de Innovación, Ciencia y Empresa de la Junta de Andalucía) to encourage collaboration between the scientific and commercial communities in Andalusia. It brings together universities and centres of investigation, innovative businesses, and public administration in Andalusia.

== Constitution ==
The CTA governing board (Patronato) includes both businesses (including, but not limited to, Airbus, Banco Santander, La Caixa, Endesa, Iberdrola, and Heineken) and research entities. The CTA has more than 180 member organisations as of 2026.

To start the CTA, 44 founding organizations from the private sector provided one million euros each; the total amount was matched by the Council of Innovation, Science and Business through the Andalusian Innovation and Development Agency (Spanish: Agencia de Innovación y Desarrollo de Andalucía), for a total of 88 million euros. The current monetary capital of the organisation is undisclosed.

== Activities ==
As of October 2026, CTA has approved 842 research and development projects. with incentives adding up to over 208 million euros. The total investment in the projects has been 604 million euros. Organisations such as the Spanish National Research Council (Spanish: Consejo Superior de Investigaciones Científicas, CSIC), the Andalusian Institute for Research and Training in Agriculture, Food and Fisheries (Spanish: Instituto de Investigación y Formación Agraria y Pesquera, IFAPA), and public hospitals have been involved.
