= L'Àgora =

Multifunctional indoor arena in Valencia, Spain

Coordinates: 39°27′13″N 0°21′0″W

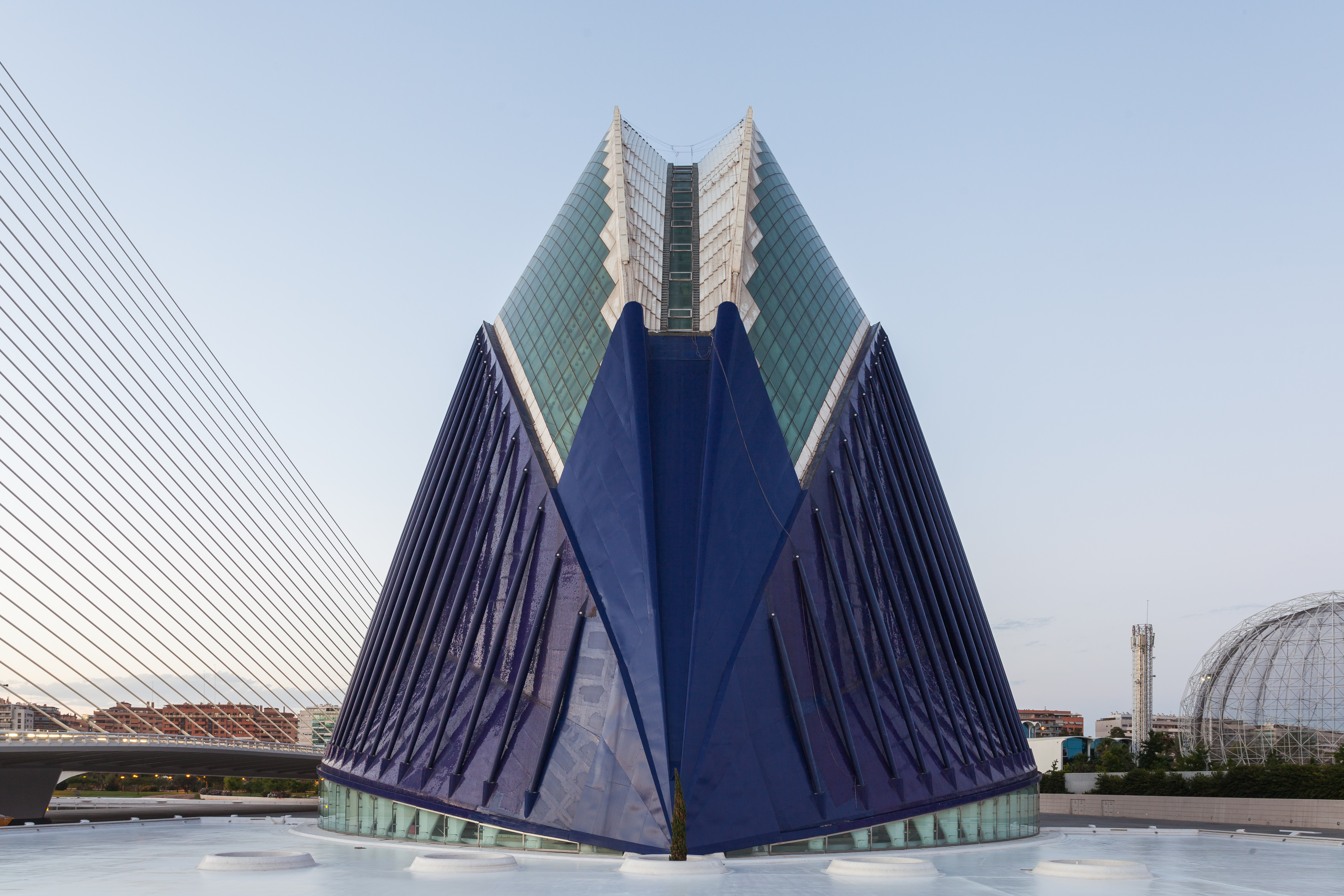
- Interactive map of L'Àgora
- Location: Valencia, Spain
- Capacity: 6,075

Construction
- Opened: 2009
- Cost: € 90 million
- Architect: Santiago Calatrava

Tenant
- Valencia Open 500 (2009–2015)

L'Àgora (Valencian: [ˈlaɣoɾa], Spanish: El Ágora [el ˈaɣoɾa]; anglicised "The Agora") is a multifunctional covered space designed by Santiago Calatrava located in the Ciutat de les Arts i les Ciències (City of Arts and Sciences) complex, Valencia, Spain.

== Design and construction ==
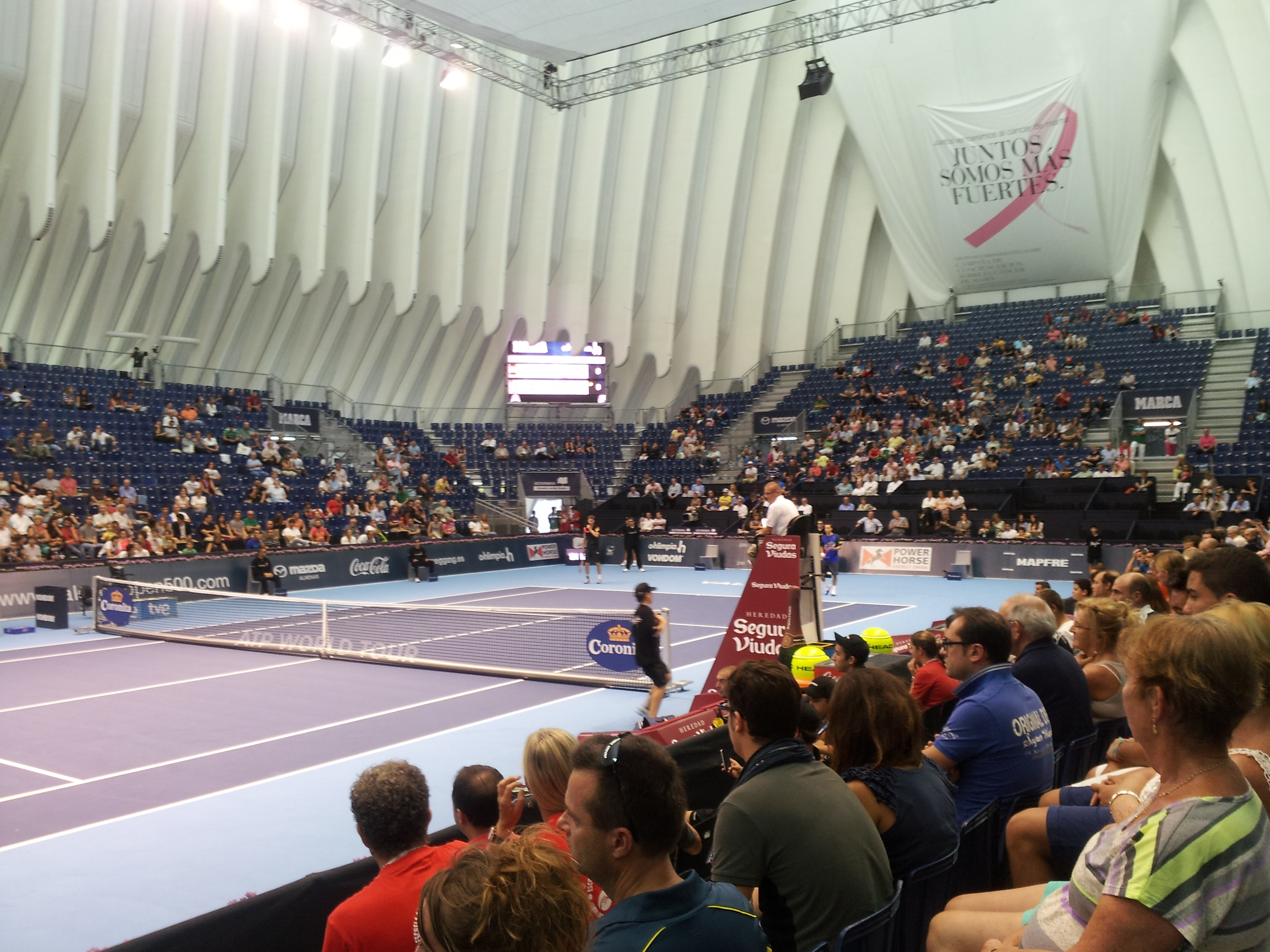
L'Àgora, with the tennis configuration in 2013

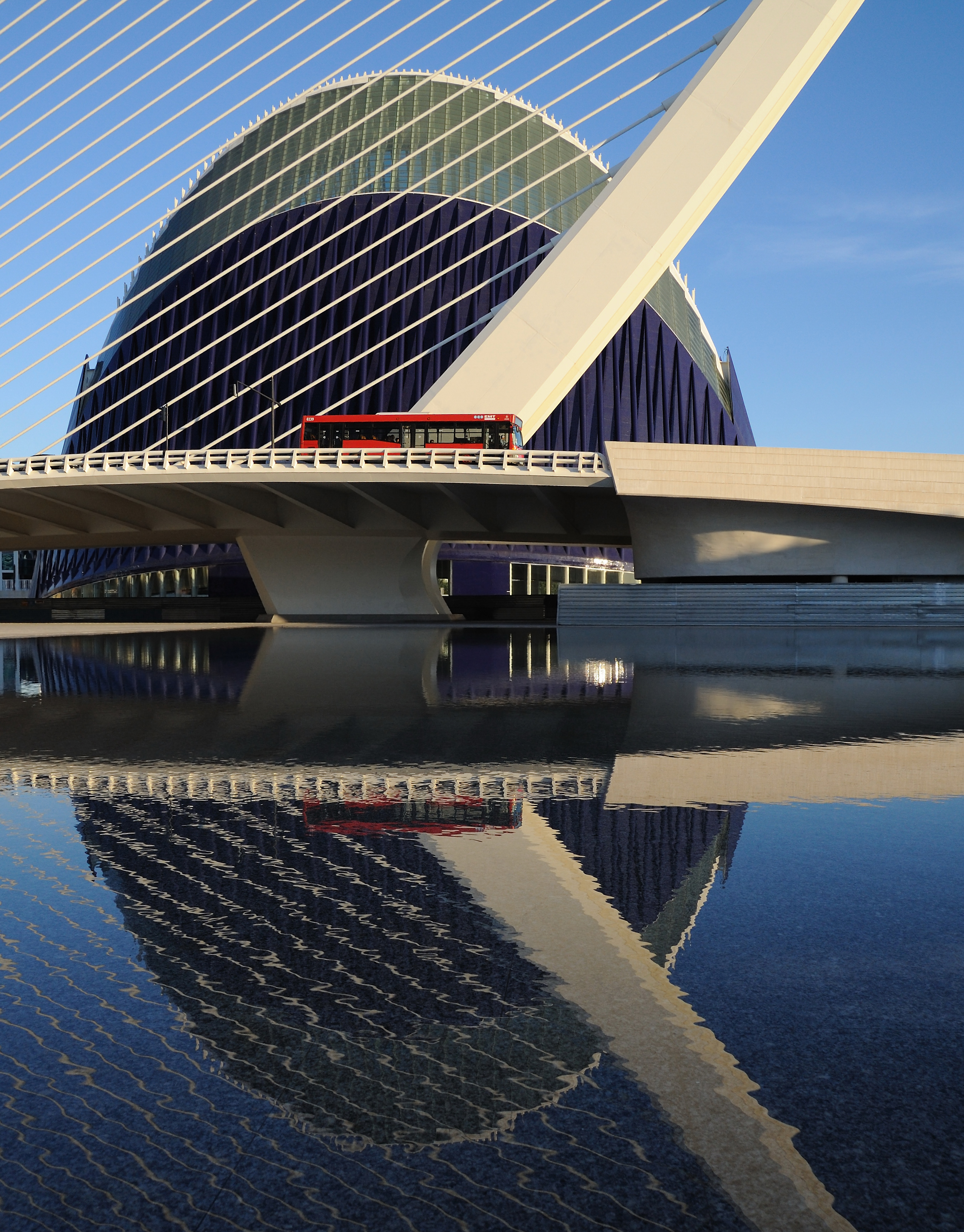
Assut de l'Or Bridge and the L'Àgora are two parts of Valencia's City of Arts and Sciences complex

The building has a height of 70 m (230 ft) and occupies 5,000 m^{2} of space with an open ground plan resembling a pointed ellipse about 88 m (289 ft) long and 66 m (217 ft) wide. Depending on the configuration of the space, a maximum seating capacity for 6,075 people can be reached.

The building is a diaphanous large arena, with a glass roof along its spine and a movable structure to control the overhead natural light. The tall white steel rib-cage arches give the interior space an organic element, whereas the exterior is geometric and abstract, in day or when illuminated at night.

L'Àgora was officially inaugurated in November 2009 to host the Valencia Open 500 ATP tournament, although the construction works were not completely finished. The Valencia Open 500 continued for six years and ended in 2015.

== CaixaForum Valencia ==
In early 2018, the Catalan architect Enric Ruiz-Geli was announced to be the winner of a private architecture competition to build the new CaixaForum Valencia inside L'Àgora. CaixaForum Valencia will adapt 6,500 square meters to house two exhibition halls, an auditorium with 300 seats, two multipurpose rooms, a bar-restaurant, a bookstore, and family and educational space on a second level. The space will offer art exhibitions, conferences, concerts and shows, social events, educational and family workshops and activities for the elderly. An investment of around 18 million euros is needed to renovate L'Àgora to house CaixaForum Valencia. In addition, about 5 million euros may be allocated annually for the maintenance, programming and operation of the center. It is expected to open in early 2021.
