= 360 Mall =

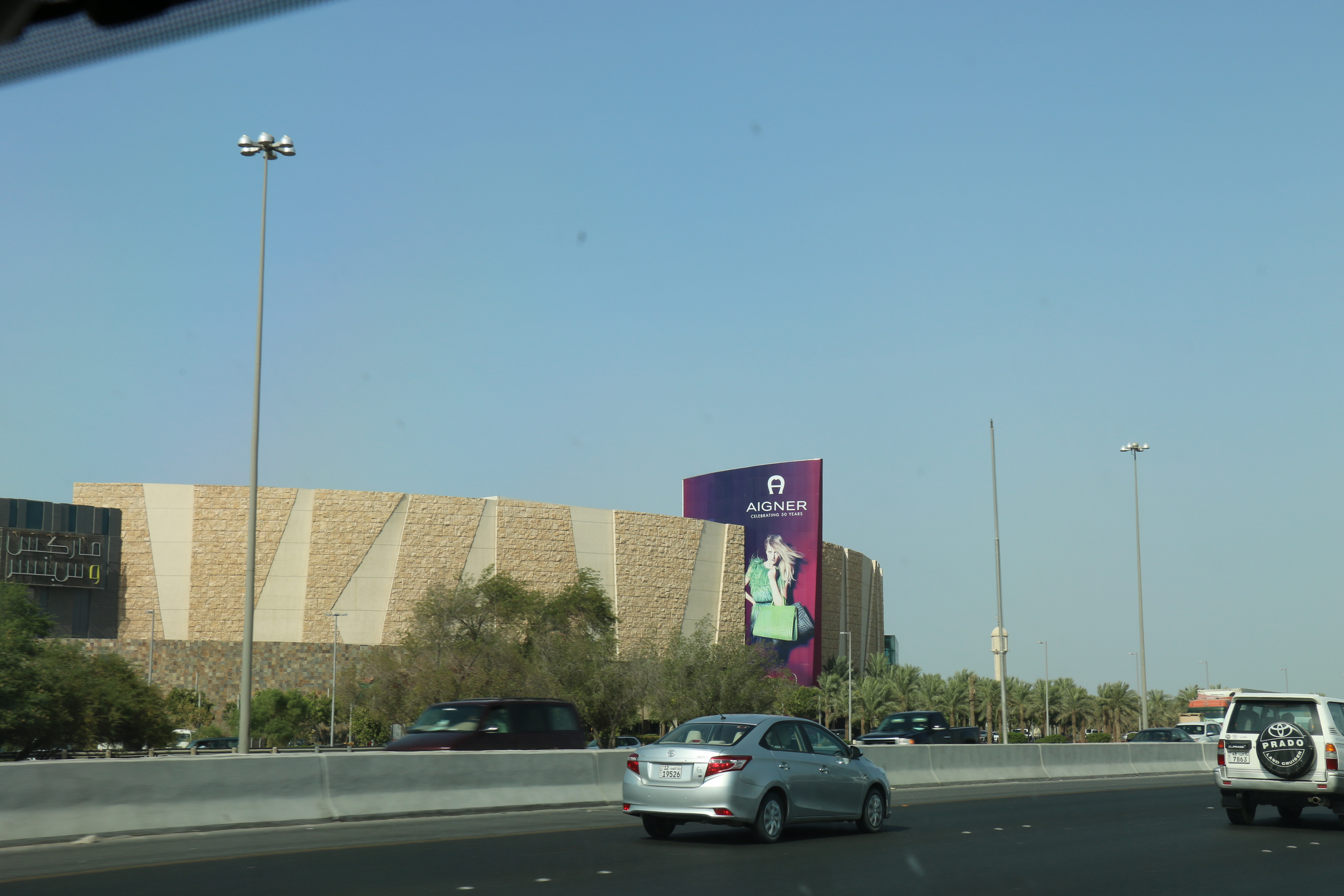
- Exterior view of 360 Mall
- Location: Surra, Kuwait
- Coordinates: 29°16′06″N 47°59′35″E
- Opened: 5 July 2009
- Floor area: 82,000 m^{2} (880,000 sq ft)

360 Mall is a shopping mall located on the Sixth Ring Highway in the South Surra, Kuwait that opened on 5 July 2009. The mall has a circular design, and its name 360 is derived from the circular design of the complex, and its design follows the modern architectural design of the exterior and interior.

The mall covers an area of 82,000 m^{2} (880,000 sq ft) and consists of three floors and three floors of offices. It contains 15 halls of Cinescape cinemas, featuring an IMAX hall and a VIP hall. It contains many restaurants and shops, and the number of 130 registered trademarks.

Bloomingdale's opened in 2017 as the mall's departmental store anchor. Other anchors including Carrefour, Cinescape, IKEA and Rafa Nadal Academy Kuwait. Sheikh Jaber Al-Abdullah Al-Jaber Al-Sabah international Tennis Complex also located inside the mall. The mall expansion connects to the original mall by bridge and is composed of a new mall concourse, a Grand Hyatt Hotel and the Rafael Nadal Tennis Academy.

The award for the best shopping center in the world in 2011, during the annual ceremony of RLI magazine, the best shopping center in the world, and it also contains the largest vertical garden in the world in order to preserve the environment, designed by the French botanist Patrick Blanc, and the complex contains parking cars with 1,800 cars, making it the largest car park for a commercial complex in the Middle East. It also has an area of 9,000 m^{2} (97,000 sq ft) and is one of the largest entertainment cities in Kuwait.

In February 2020, the mall opened a new extension connected to the original mall via a climate-controlled bridge with additional retail stores, a food hall and the Rafa Nadal Tennis Academy. In September 2022, the 302-room Grand Hyatt Kuwait opened within the overall development and with a direct connection to the extension.
