= CaixaForum Madrid =

Museum in Madrid, Spain

Coordinates: 40°24′39.65″N 3°41′35.09″W

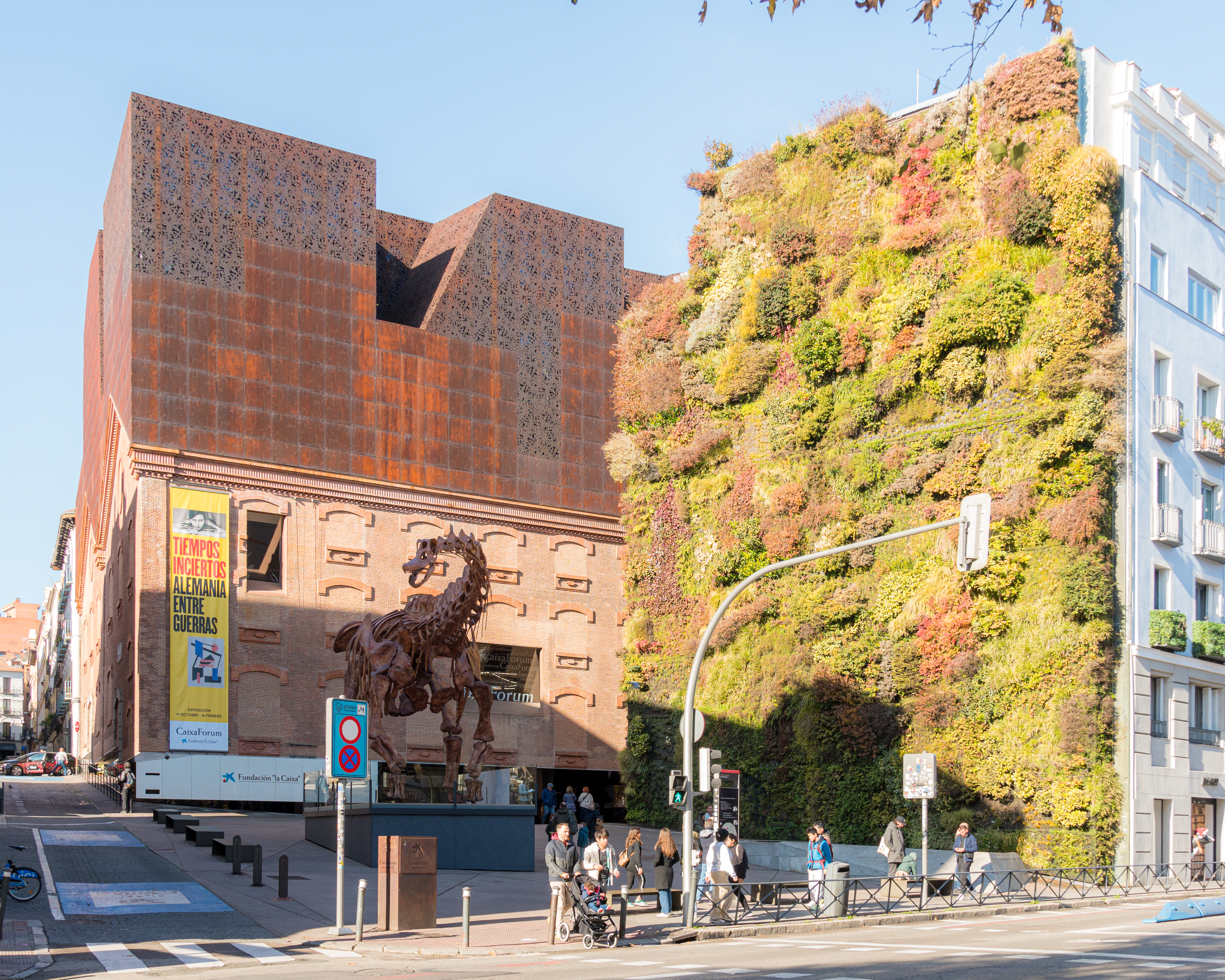
- CaixaForum Madrid and Vertical Garden in 2024
- Established: 2008
- Location: Madrid, Spain
- Type: Cultural center
- Owner: Fundación ”la Caixa”
- Website: Caixa Forum Madrid

CaixaForum Madrid is a cultural center in Madrid, Spain. Located in Paseo del Prado in a former power station, it is owned by the not-for-profit banking foundation "la Caixa". The art center opened its doors in 2008 and it hosts temporary art exhibitions and cultural events.

The cultural center was designed by the Swiss architects Herzog & de Meuron and built by Ferrovial between 2001 and 2007. It was an old power station called Central Del Mediodía, from the 1900s. The Vertical Garden by Patrick Blanc at the square is also well-known.

== Gallery ==
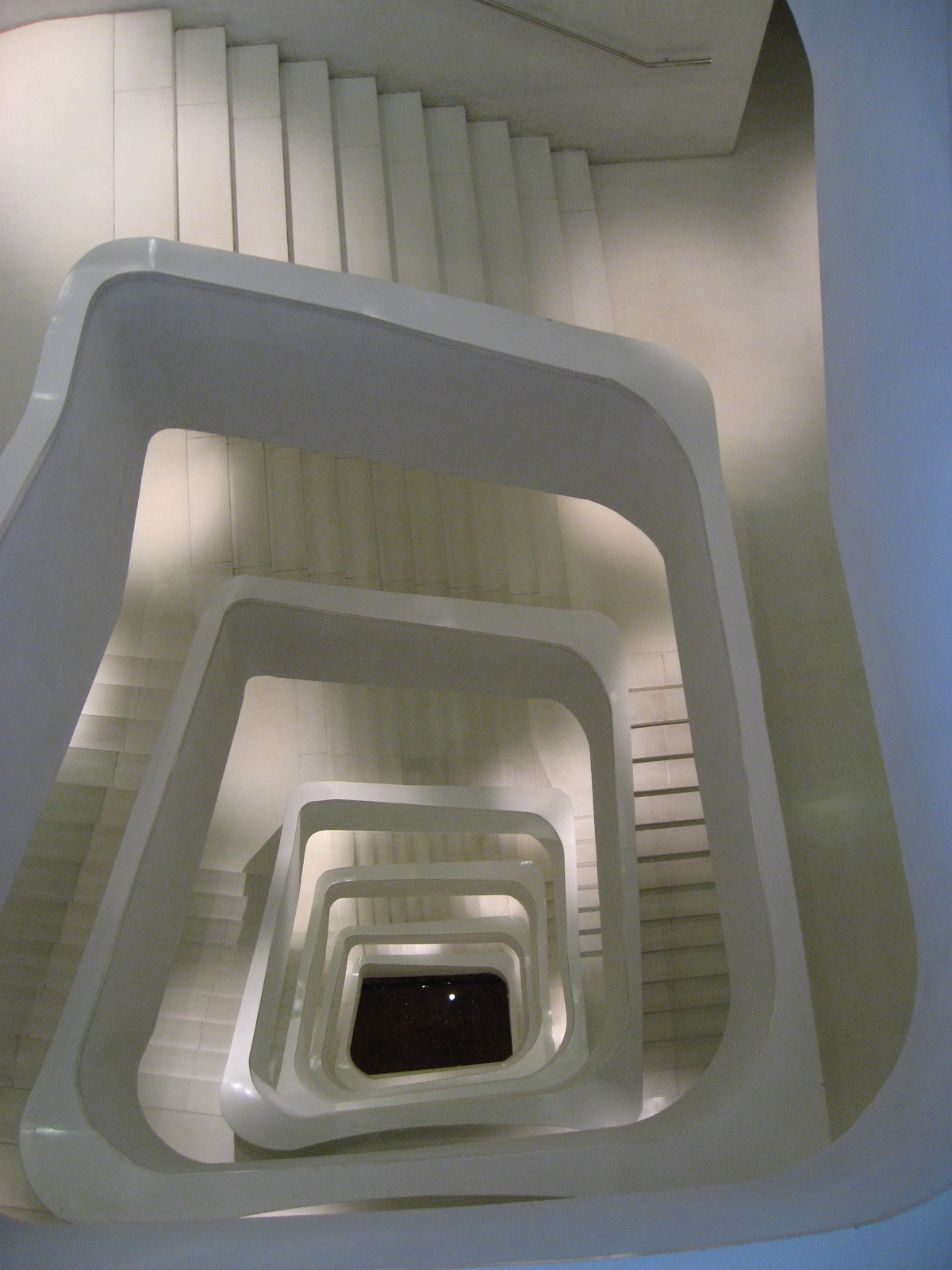
Central stairway.

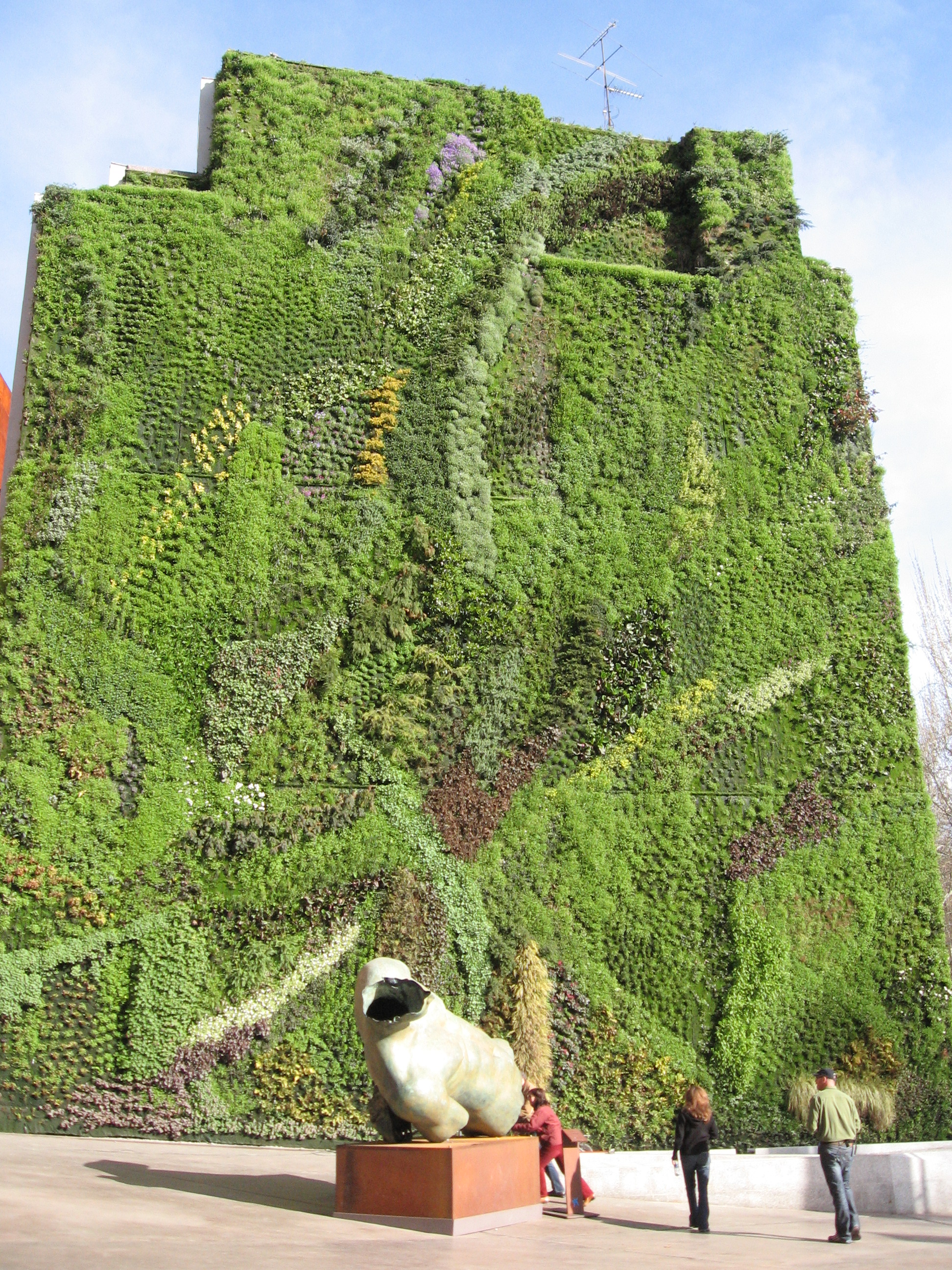
The vertical garden in 2007.

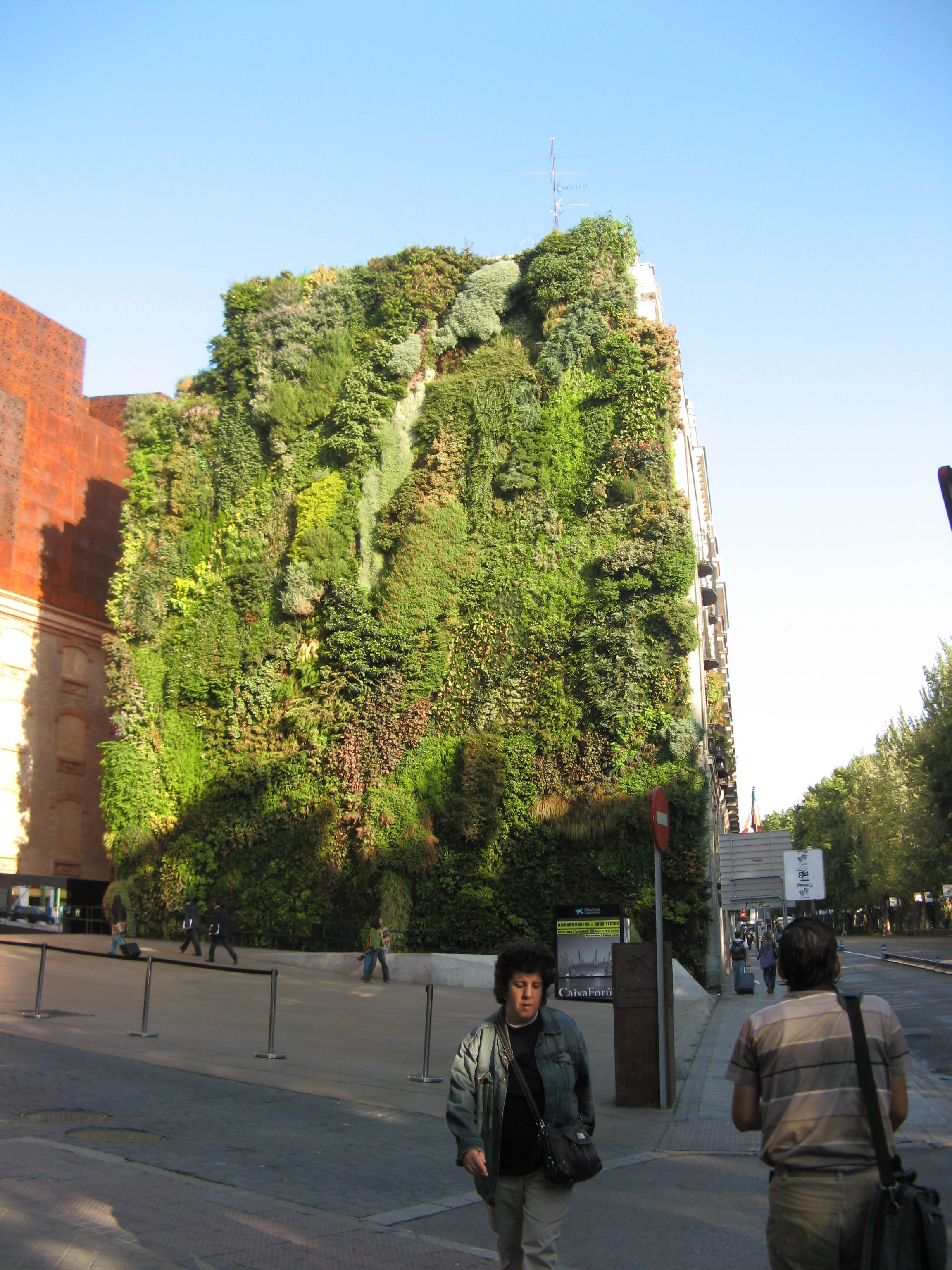
The vertical garden in 2009.

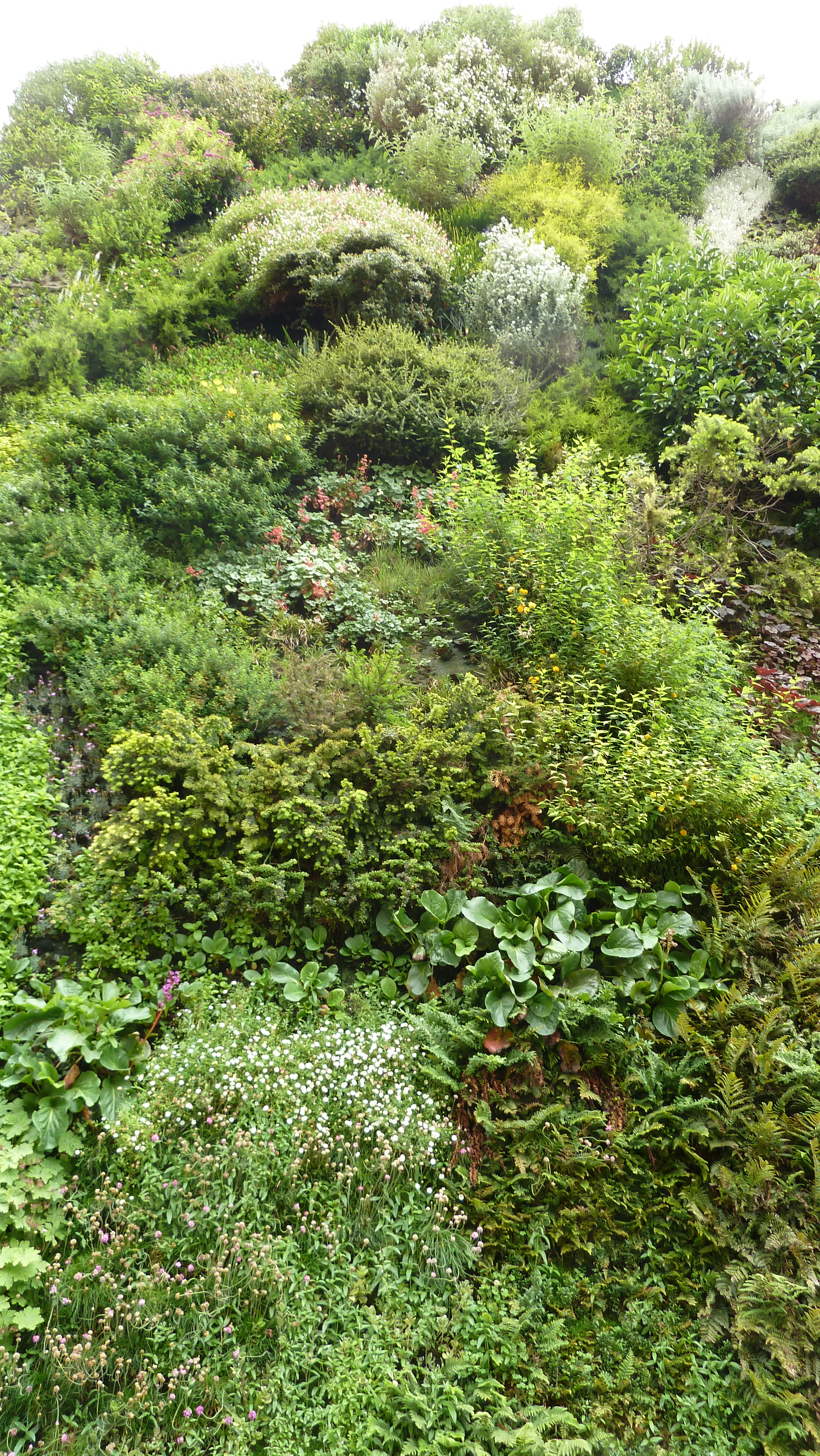
Détail of the vertical garden in 2011.

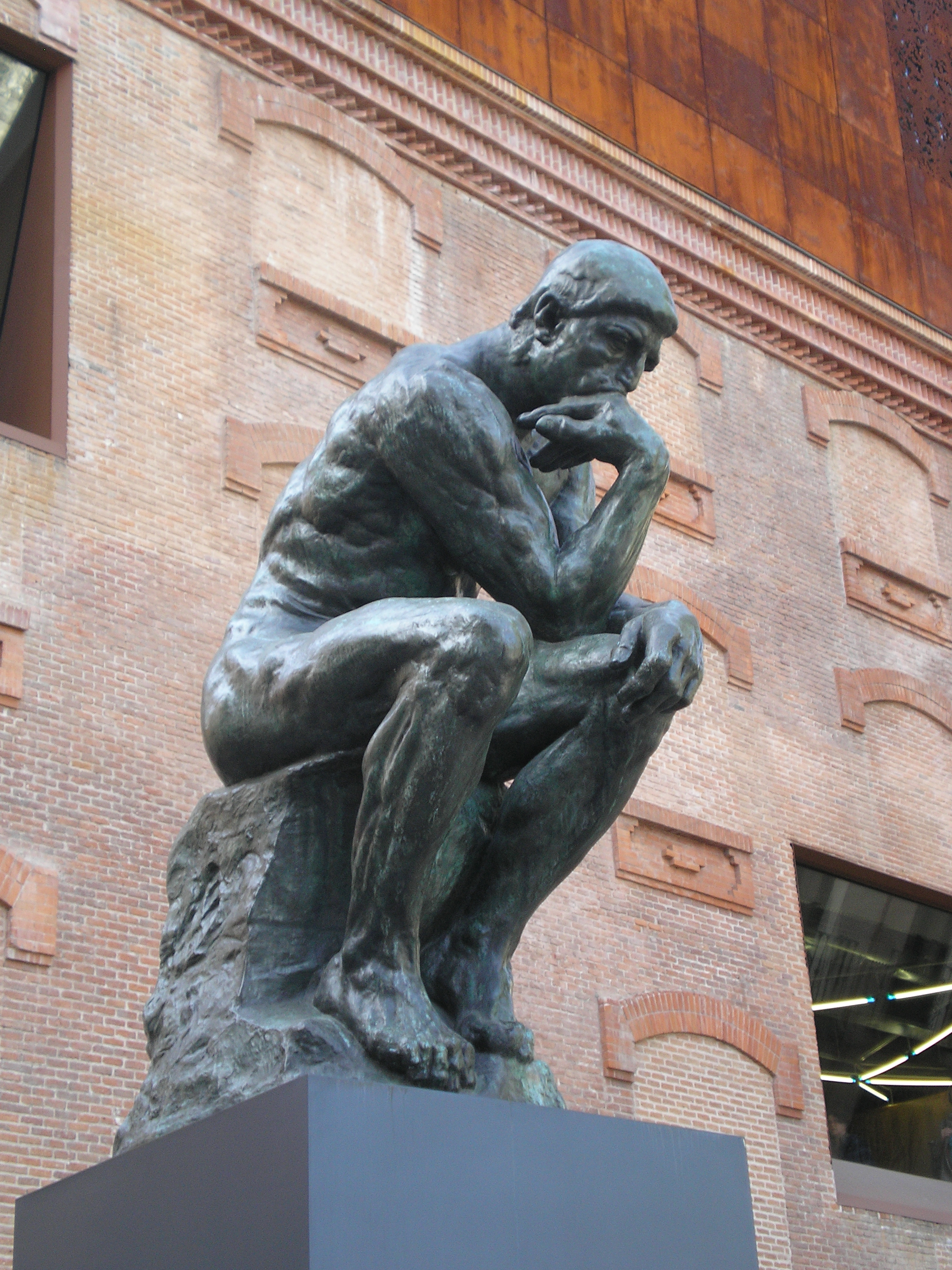
The Thinker, temporary exhibition.

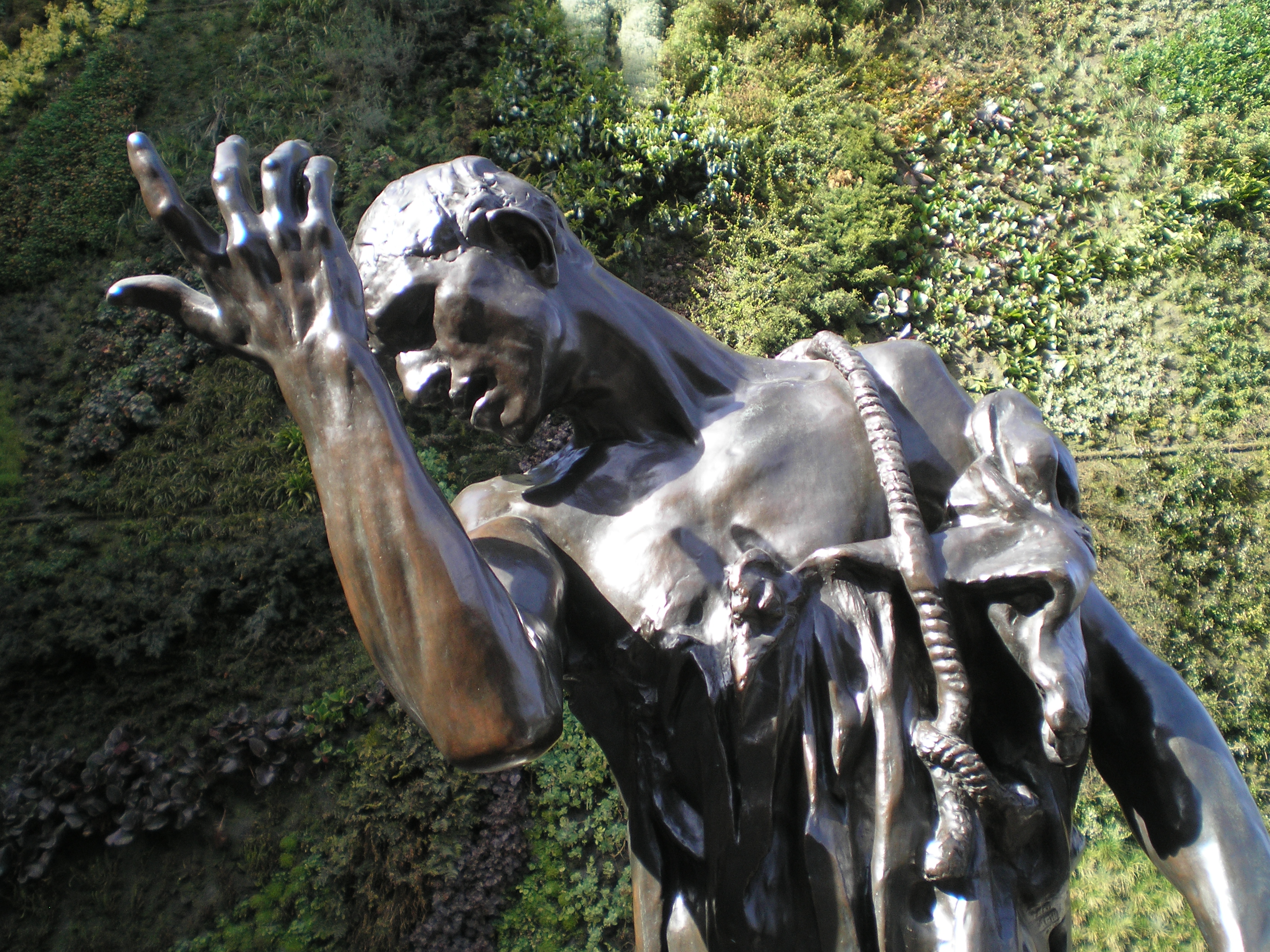
Pierre de Wissant, one of The Burghers of Calais, by Auguste Rodin

== See also ==
- CaixaForum Lleida
- CaixaForum Barcelona
