= Patrick Blanc =

French botanist (born 1953)

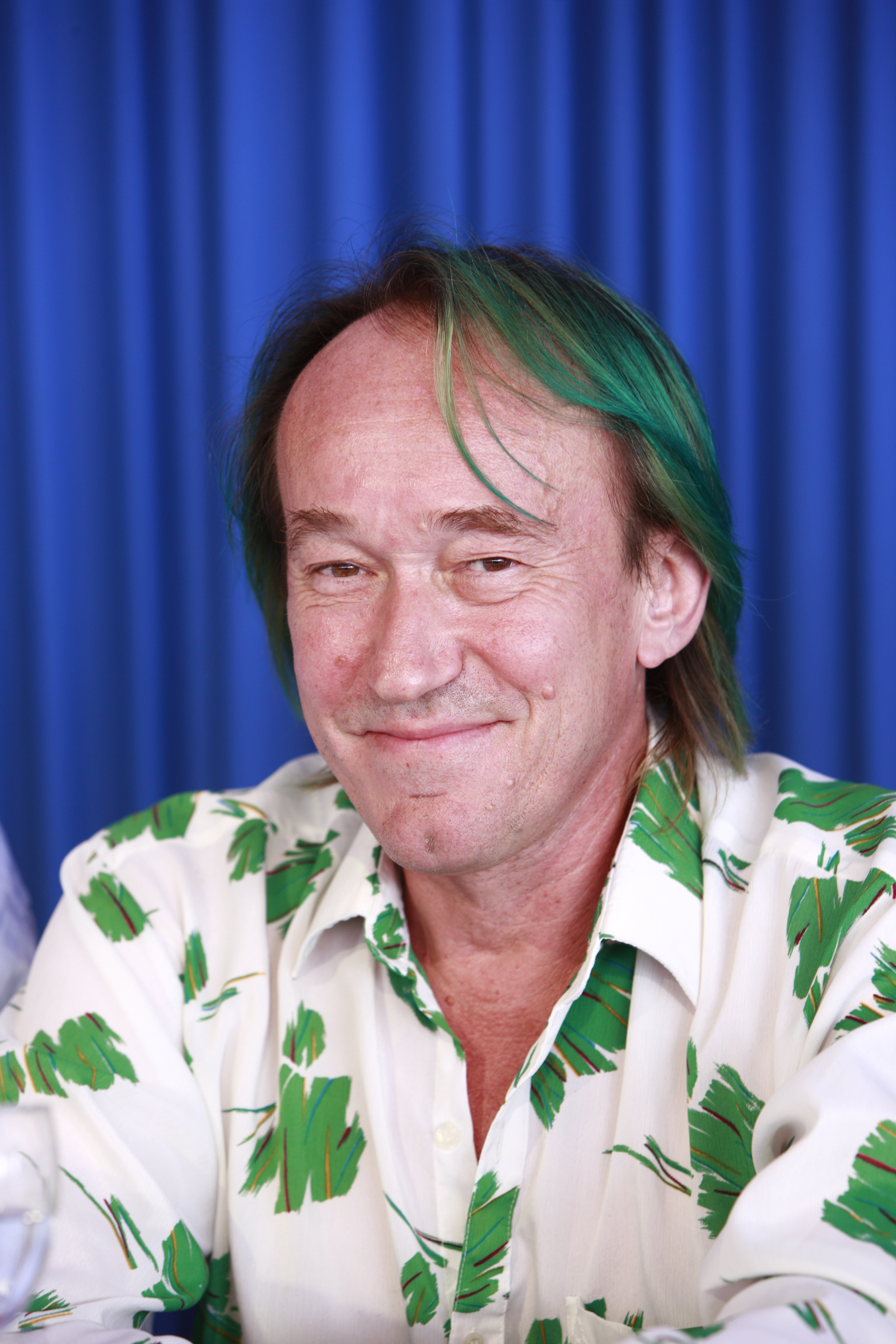
- Born: June 3, 1953; Issy-les-Moulineaux
- Occupation: botanist French National Centre for Scientific Research
- Partner: Pascal Héni
- Website: www.verticalgardenpatrickblanc.com/

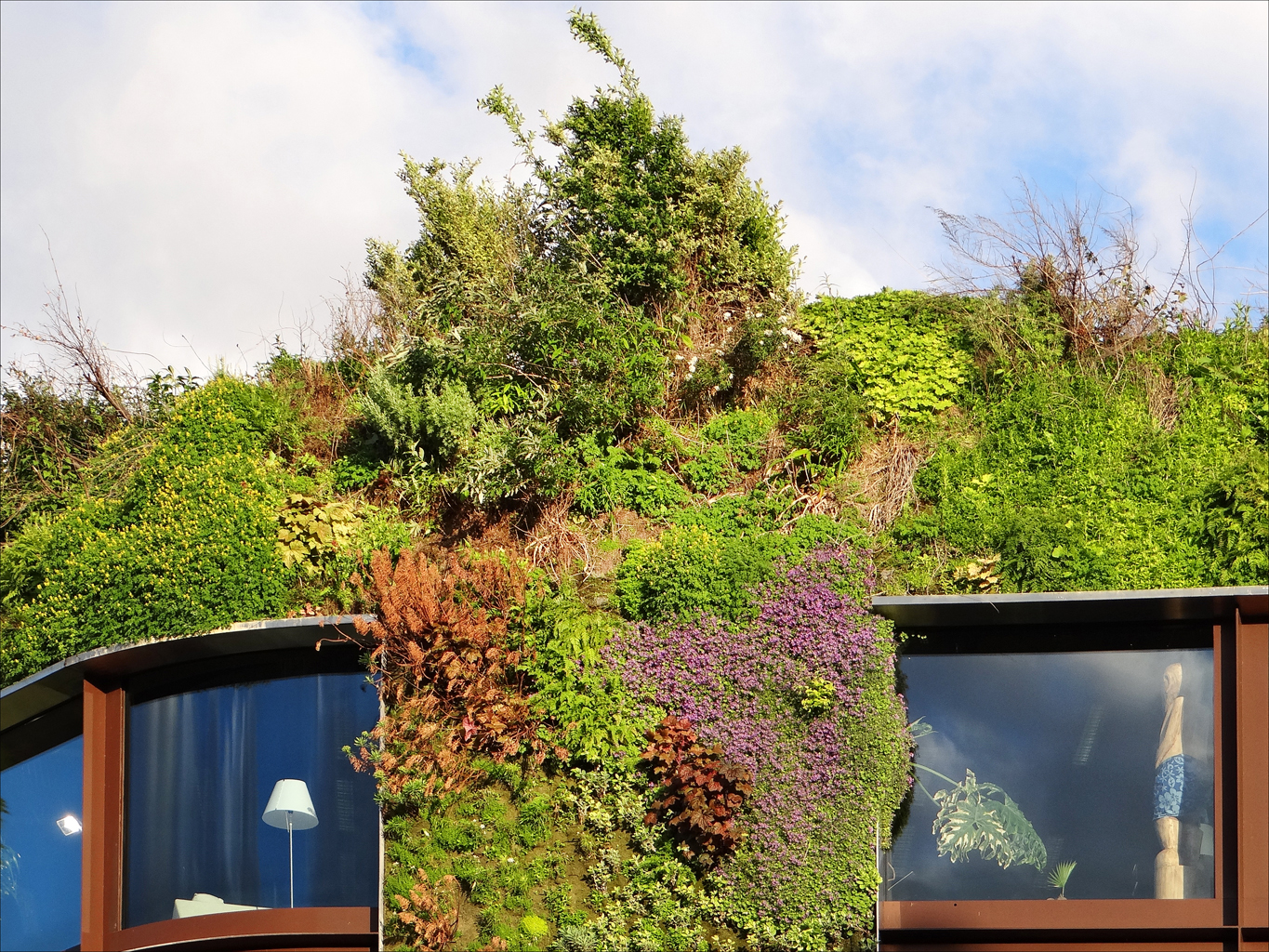
Vertical garden of the Musée du Quai Branly in 2012.

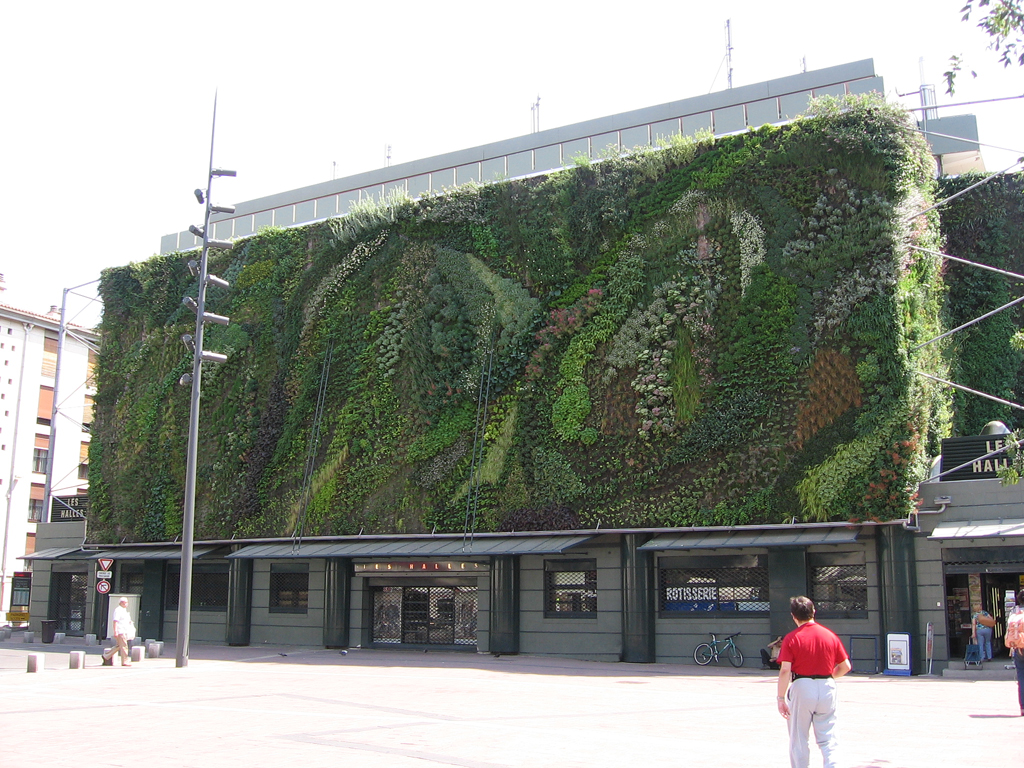
Halles, Avignon (2005) at the date of creation.

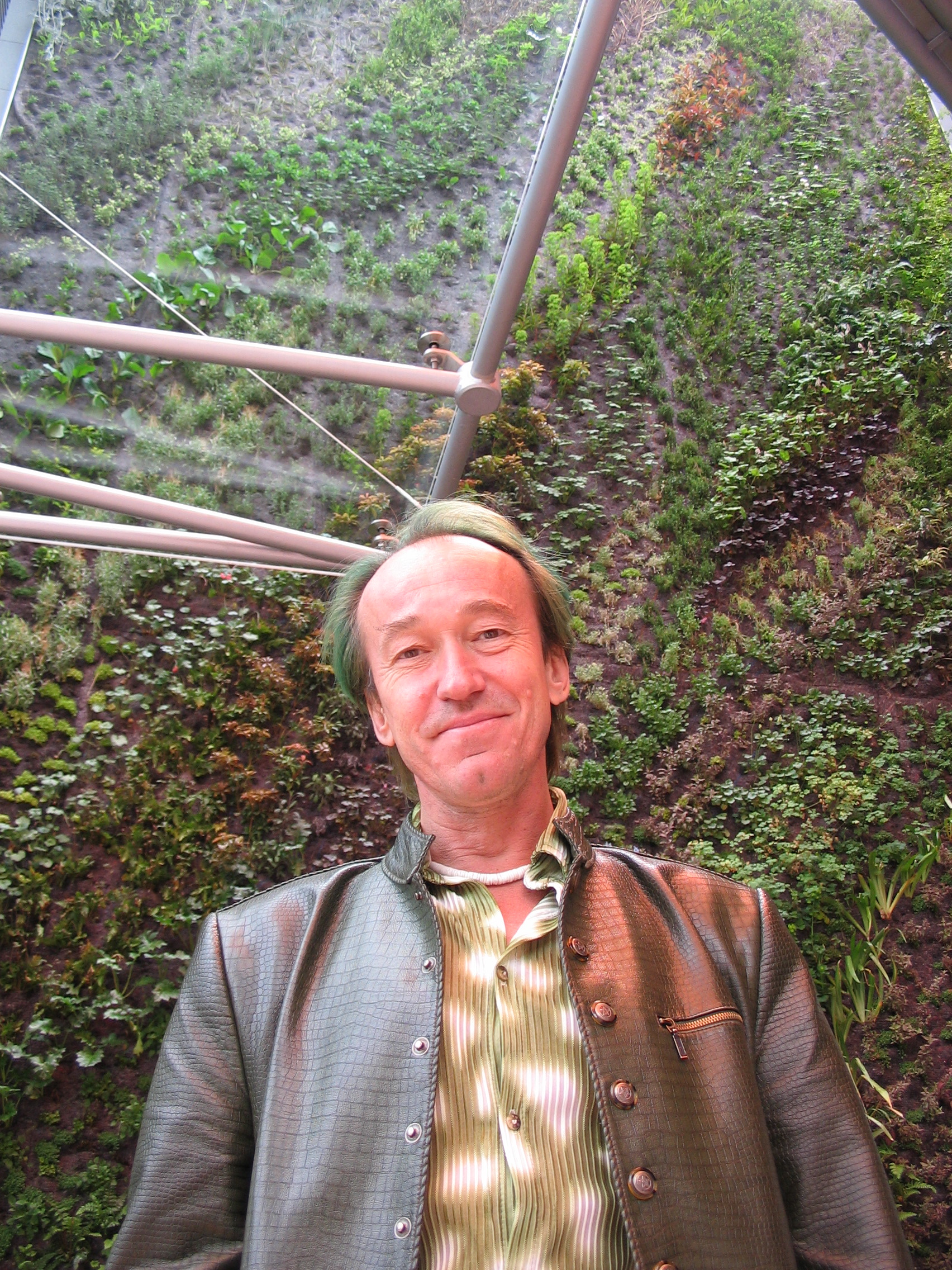
Patrick Blanc, Centre commercial des quatre Temps (2006), La Défense, (Puteaux).

Patrick Blanc (born June 3, 1953, Paris) is a French botanist who works at the French National Centre for Scientific Research, where he specializes in plants from tropical forests.

== Career and Impact ==
He is the modern innovator of the green wall; specifically, he invented the modern vertical hydroponics garden, which distinguishes it from its predecessors (aka the Green Wall, Botanical Brick invented by Professor Stanley Hart White at the University of Illinois Urbana-Champaign in 1938).

Blanc's contemporary patents are responsible for modernizing and popularizing the garden type. Blanc describes his vertical garden as follows:

On a load-bearing wall or structure is placed a metal frame that supports a PVC plate 10 millimetres (0.39 in) thick, on which are stapled two layers of polyamide felt each 3 millimetres (0.12 in) thick. These layers mimic cliff-growing mosses and support the roots of many plants. A network of pipes controlled by valves provides a nutrient solution containing dissolved minerals needed for plant growth. The felt is soaked by capillary action with this nutrient solution, which flows down the wall by gravity. The roots of the plants take up the nutrients they need, and excess water is collected at the bottom of the wall by a gutter, before being re-injected into the network of pipes: the system works in a closed circuit. Plants are chosen for their ability to grow on this type of environment and depending on available light.

This system exemplifies Blanc's ideas as a scientist and also the 15th target of the Haute Qualité Environnementale ("High Quality Environment") project, although the latter gives particular stress to use of more local species, at least outdoors.

In 2009 he was awarded an Honorary Fellow of the Royal Institute of British Architects.

== Works ==
Green walls

- 1988: green wall, made at the Museum of Science and Industry in Paris
- 1998: Fondation Cartier in Paris
- 2000: Aquarium of Genoa, Italy
- 2001: Pershing Hall Hotel in Paris
- 2003: Marithé & François Girbaud boutique in Manhattan
- 2003: French Embassy in New Delhi
- 2004: Green façade at the Administrative building of the Quai Branly Museum in Paris
- 2004: 21st Century Museum of Contemporary Art, Kanazawa, Japan.
- 2005: North face of the shopping centre in Avignon
- 2005: Vinet Square in Bordeaux (with Michel Desvigne)
- 2005: Siam Paragon shopping center in Bangkok
- 2006: Weleda, 8th arrondissement of Paris
- 2007: BHV Hommes shop (BHV for men), 4th arrondissement of Paris
- 2007: CaixaForum Madrid
- 2008: Arch at the roundabout at the Grand Theatre of Provence at Aix-en-Provence
- 2008: Galeria Przymorze, shopping centre in Gdańsk, Poland
- 2008: Melbourne Central Shopping Centre, Australia
- 2008: Galeries Lafayette, Berlin Friedrichstraße, Germany
- 2009: The Athenaeum Hotel, Piccadilly, London, UK
- 2009: 360 Mall, Kuwait
- 2010: Ronald Lu & Partners, Hong Kong
- 2014: Central Park, Sydney
- 2016: Le Nouvel Towers, Kuala Lumpur
- 2018: Museum of Contemporary Art, Busan

Other works

- 1994: Garden Festival of Chaumont-sur-Loire

== Bibliography ==
- 1990: Biologie d'une canopée de forêt équatoriale : rapport de Mission Radeau des cimes, octobre-novembre 1989, Petit Saut, - Guyane française, ("Biology under an equatorial forest: report of Study Radeus, October–November 1989, French Guiana, a collective study under the direction of Francis Hallé et Patrick Blanc, Departement of Industry and xylochemistry
- 2002: Être plante à l'ombre des forêts tropicales ("Putting plants in the light of tropical forests"), Éditions Nathan
- 2005: Le bonheur d'être plante, ("The pleasure of being a plant"), Éditions Maren Sell (ISBN 2-350-04018-6)
- 2007: Folies végétales ("Plants' follies"), (lecture, Paris), éditions Chêne
- 2008: Le Mur Végétal, de la nature à la ville ("The green wall in town and country"), éditions Michel Lafon

== See also ==
- Green roof
- Urban agriculture
- List of gardening topics
- Hanging Gardens of Babylon

== Gallery ==
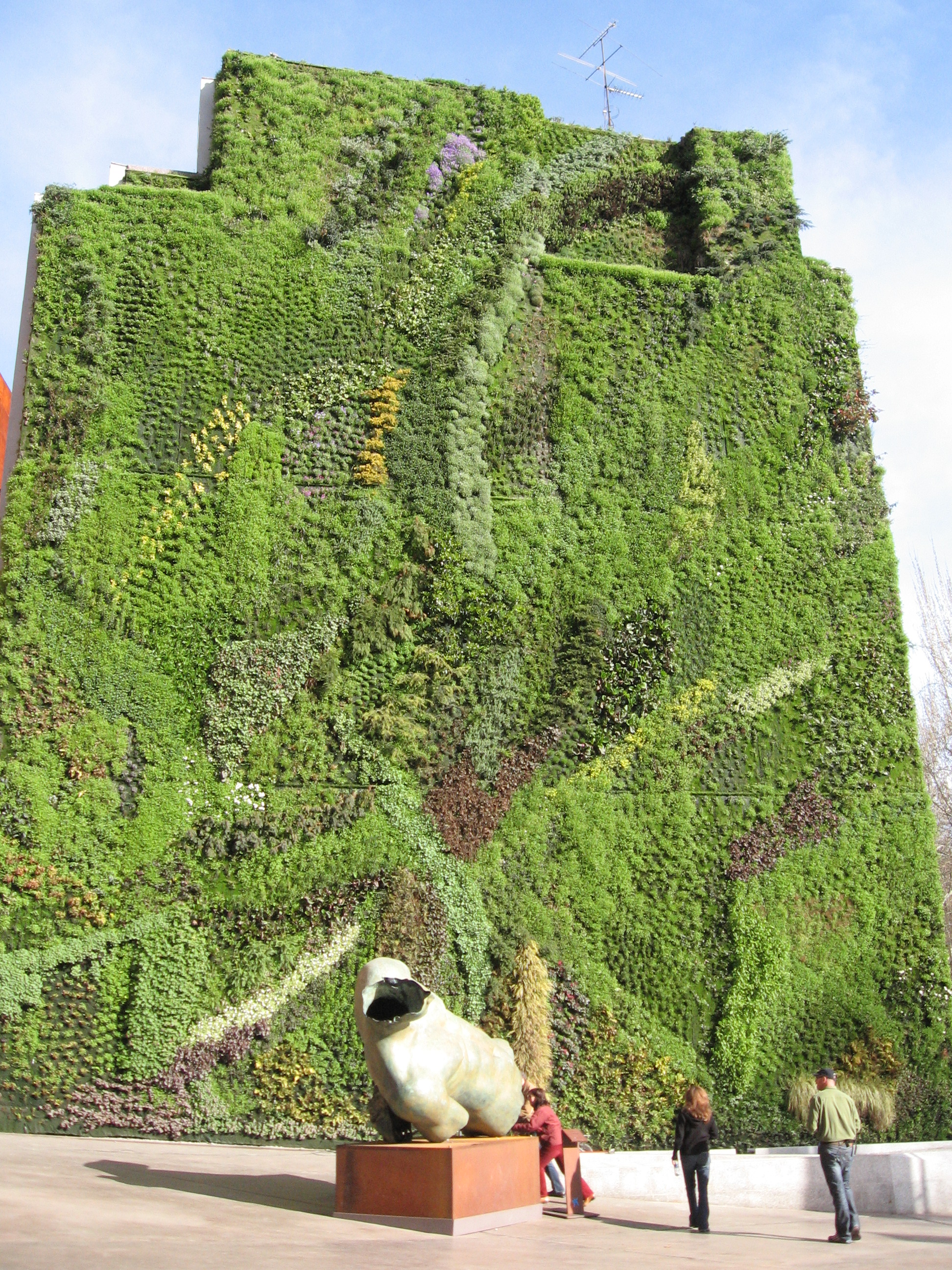
The vertical garden of CaixaForum Madrid at its creation in 2007.

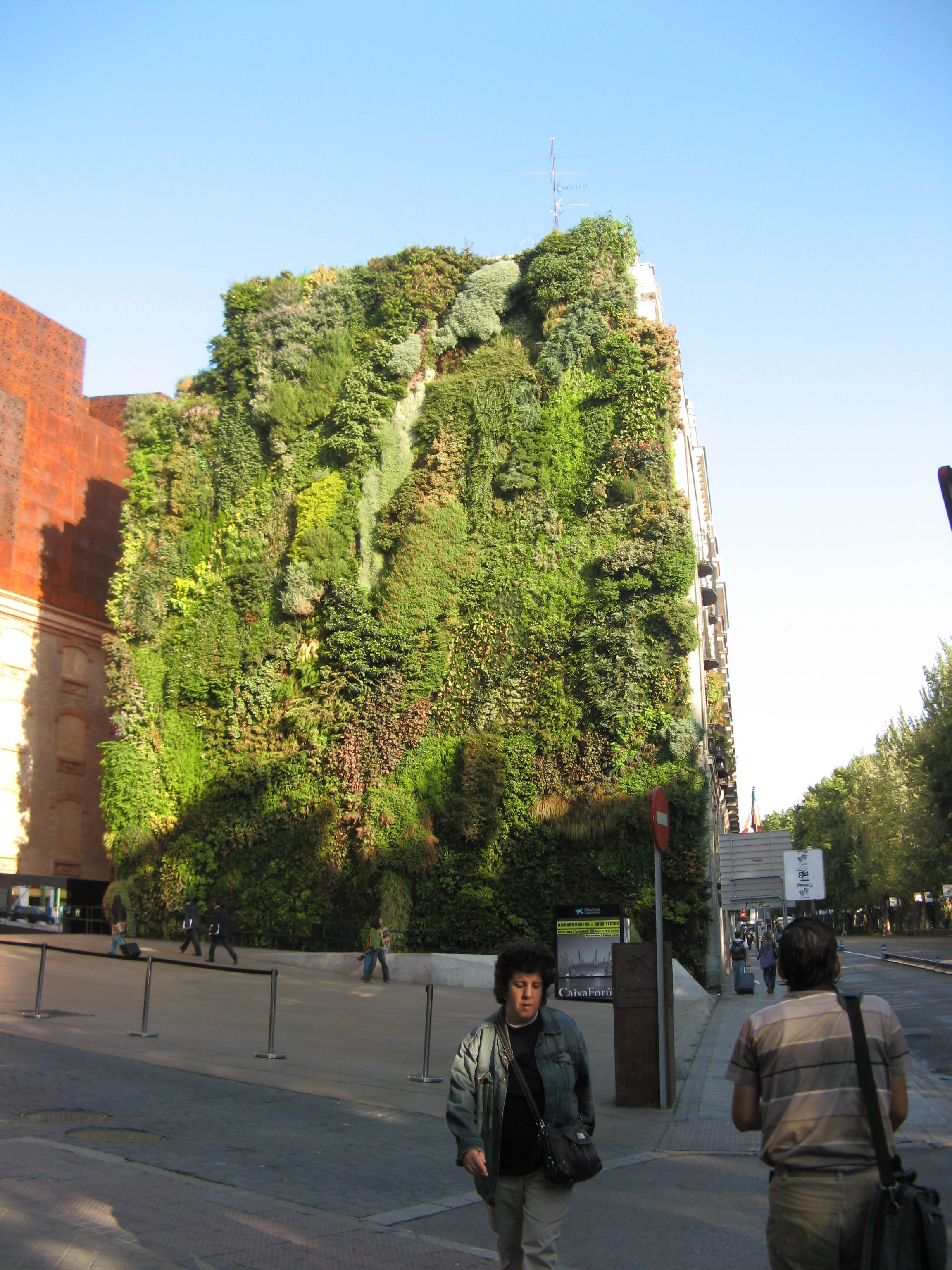
CaixaForum in 2009.

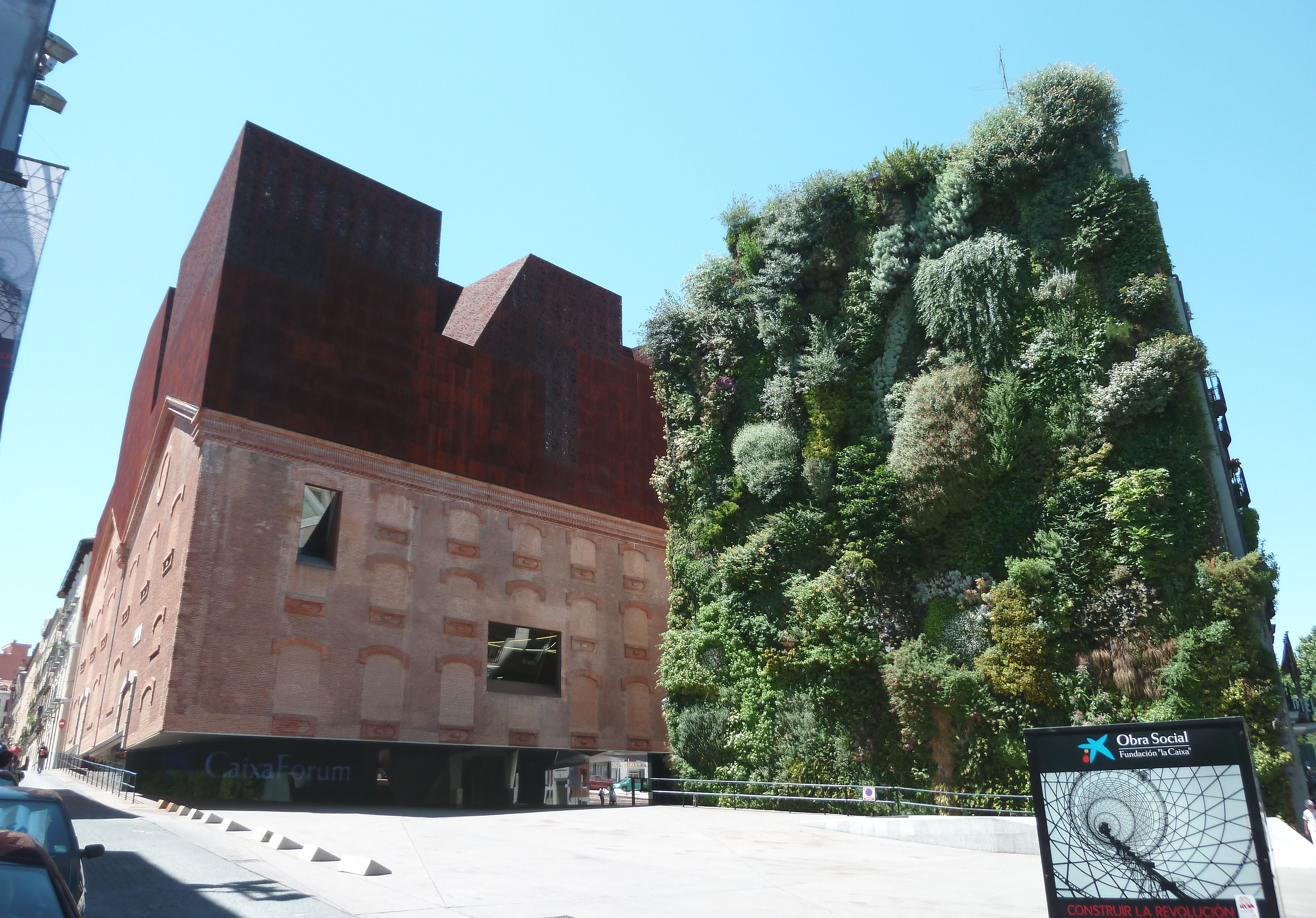
CaixaForum in 2011, showing the evolution of the vegetation in 4 years.

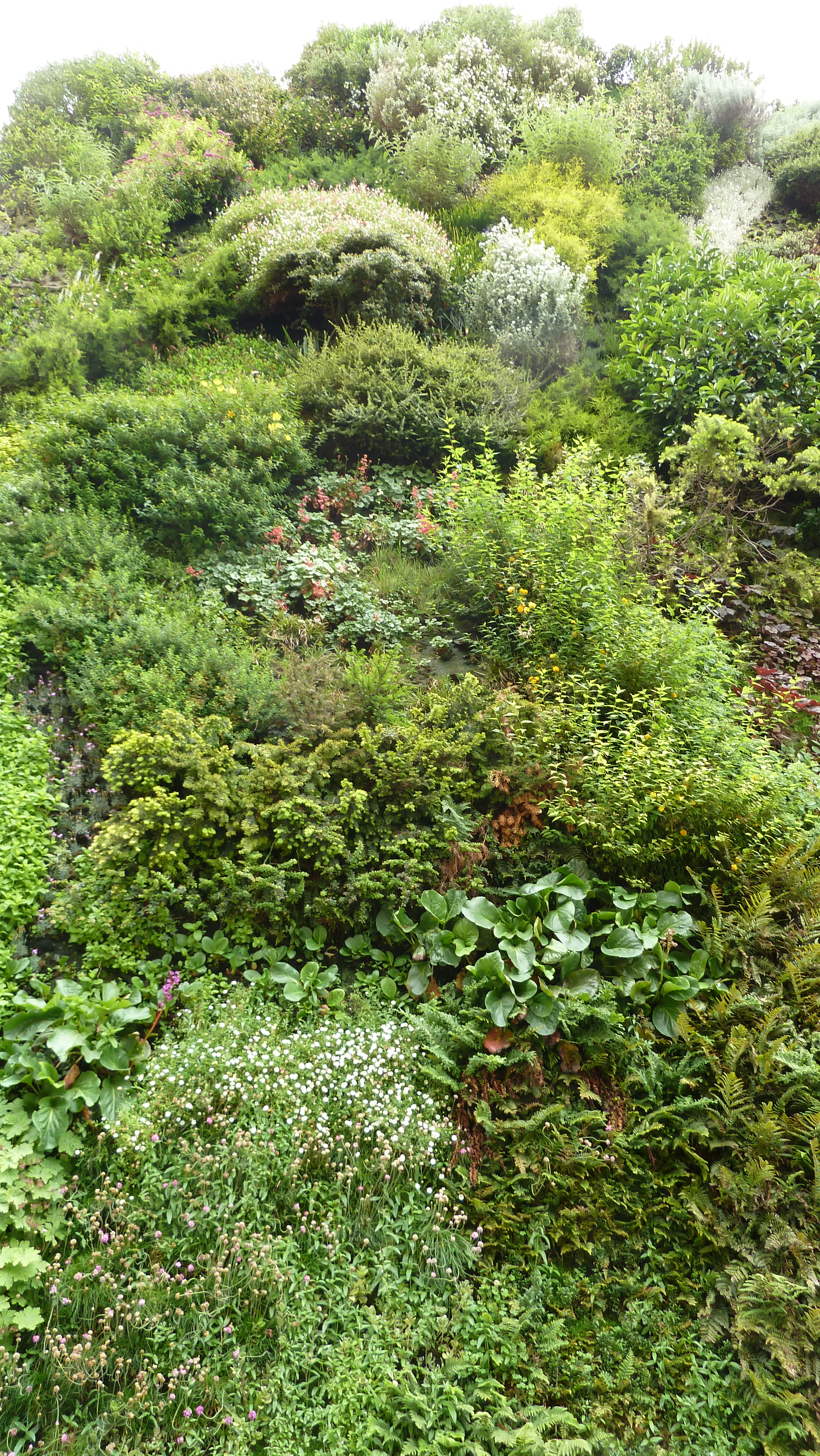
Detail of CaixaForum in 2011.

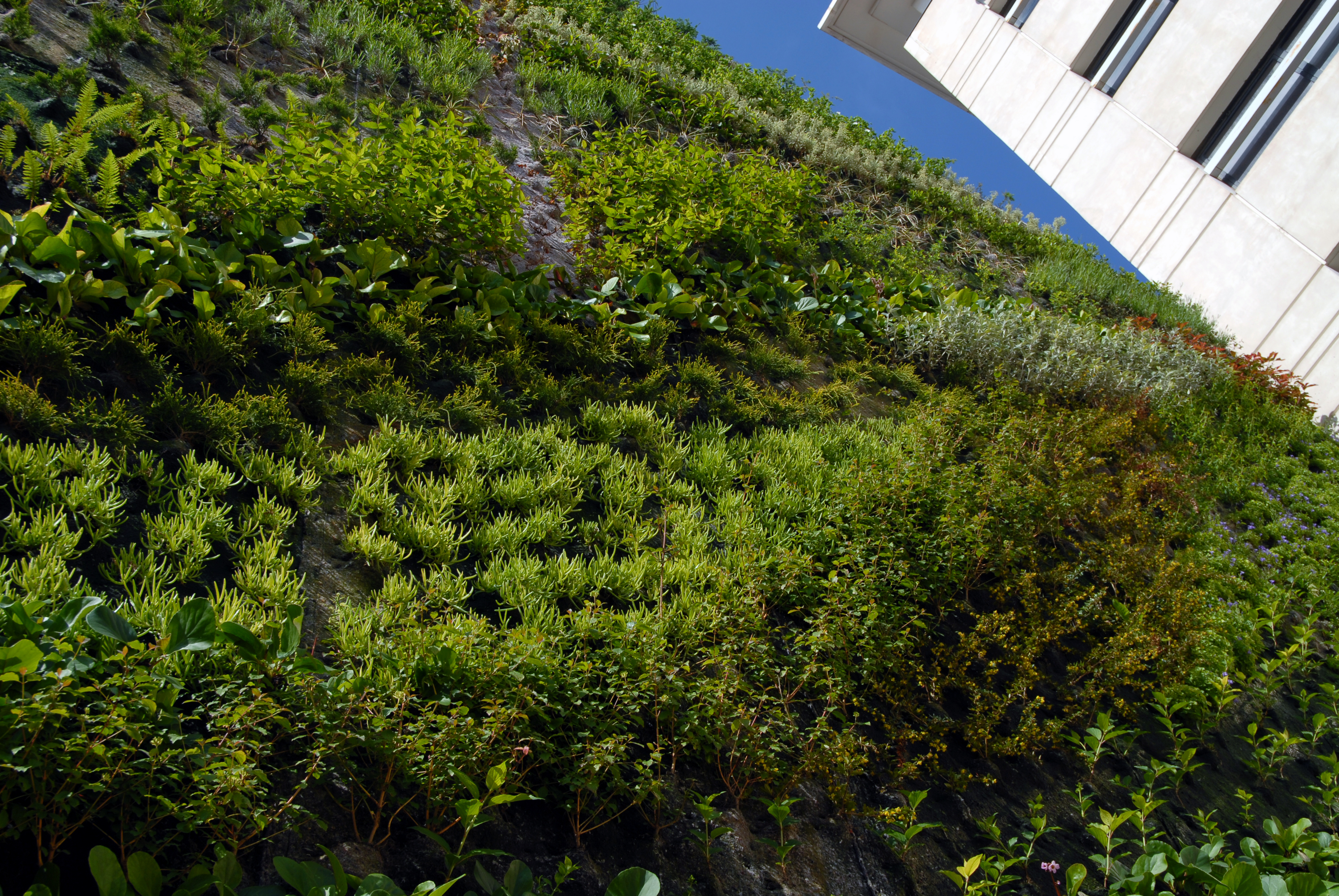
Vertical garden of the Arche du rond point du Grand Théâtre de Provence, in Aix-en-Provence (2008).
