= CaixaForum Barcelona =

Cultural center in Barcelona, Spain

Coordinates: 41°22′16.79″N 2°8′59.1″E

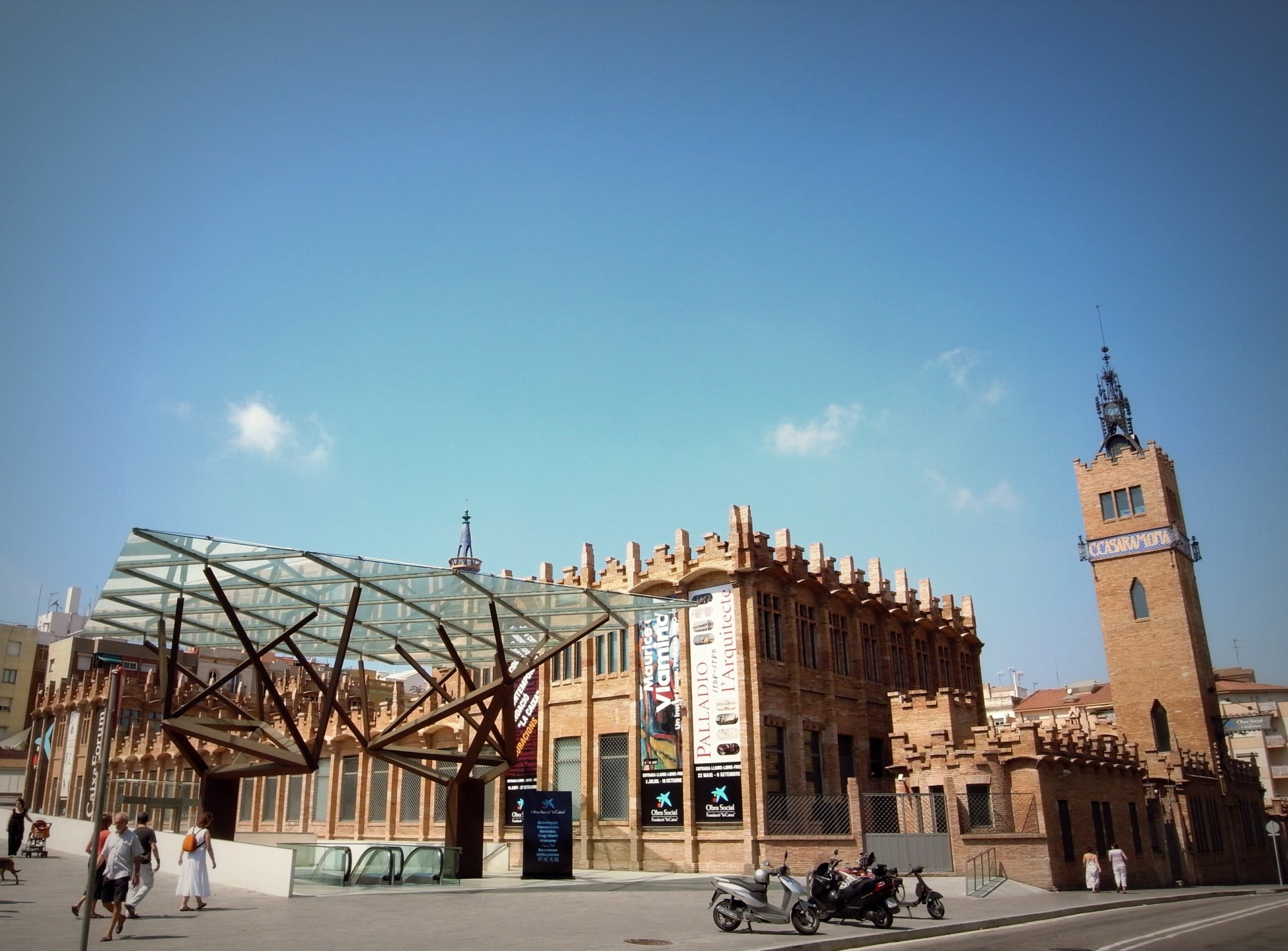
- Established: February 2002
- Location: Av. de Francesc Ferrer i Guàrdia, 6-8 08038 Barcelona
- Type: Cultural center
- Visitors: 782,529 (2011)
- Owner: Fundación ”la Caixa”
- Public transit access: Plaça d'Espanya
- Website: caixaforum.org/es/barcelona

CaixaForum Barcelona is a cultural center in Barcelona, Catalonia, Spain. Located in the Montjuïc area in a former Modernist textile factory designed by Josep Puig i Cadafalch, it is owned by the not-for-profit banking foundation "la Caixa". After a restoration of the building, the art center opened its doors in 2002 and since then it hosts temporary art exhibitions and cultural events.

== The building ==
The building was originally commissioned as a textile factory by Casimir Casaramona i Puigcercós, and built by the famous Catalan Modernism architect Josep Puig i Cadafalch. Called the Casaramona factory, it was completed in 1911, and the same year won the City Council's award for best industrial building. The factory closed in 1919, but reopened as a warehouse for the 1929 Barcelona International Exposition.

In 1940, the building was used as a cavalry barracks for the Spanish Armed Police Corps, and it was used as such until the "la Caixa" banking foundation bought it in 1963. It was opened as a cultural center in February 2002. The building was restored prior to its opening, and a new entrance was built, designed by Japanese architect Arata Isozaki, in a process that included firing 100,000 bricks to match the original ones.

The center has almost three acres of exhibition space, a media library, auditorium, classrooms and a restaurant. Visitors descend by escalator to the basement lobby, adorned by a Sol LeWitt mural, then rise again to the exhibition spaces on the ground floor, within the crenelated brickwork.

== Gallery ==
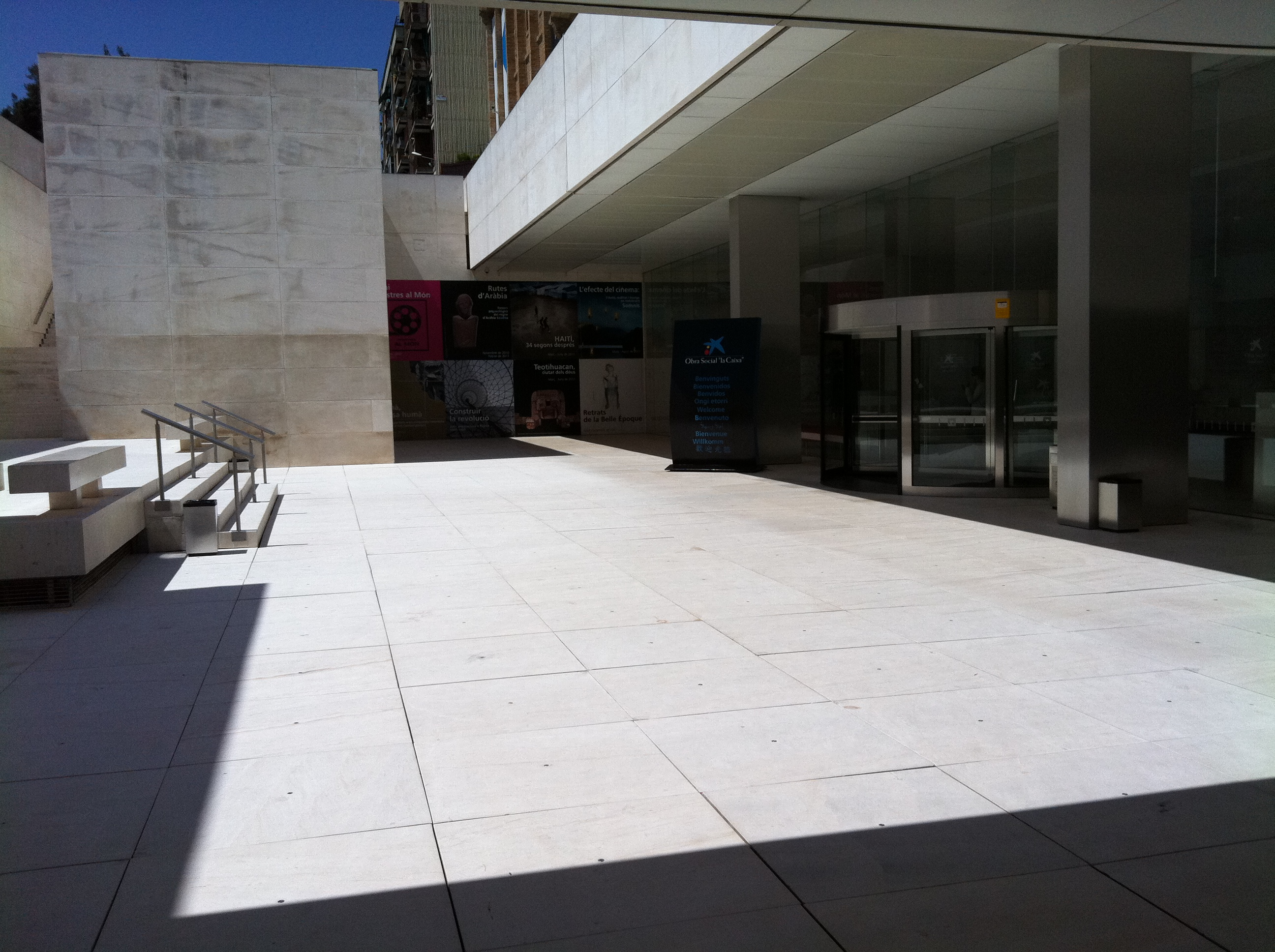
Main entrance, designed by Arata Isozaki

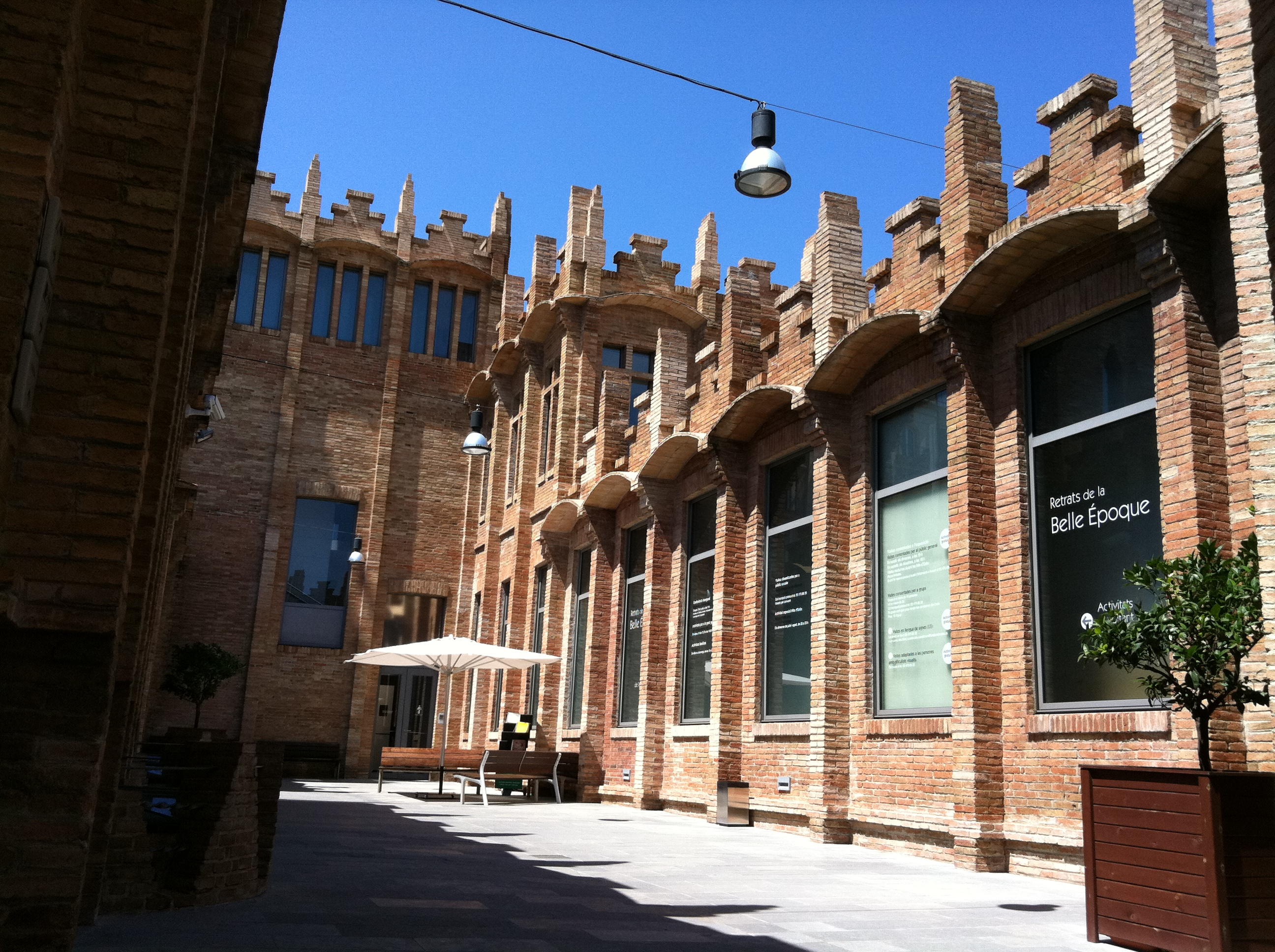
Interior courtyard, showing distinctive window shapes and brickwork

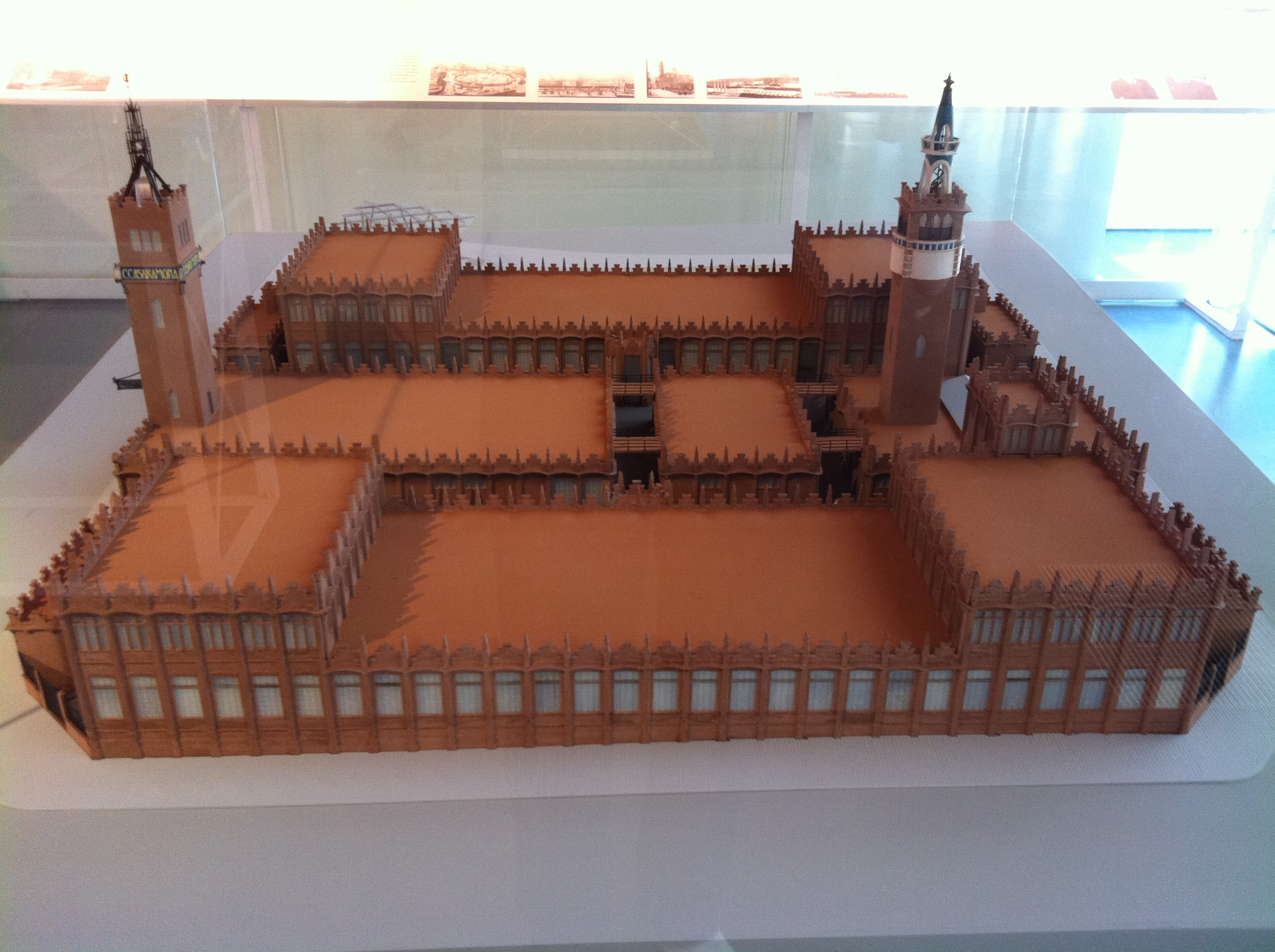
A model of the building

== See also ==
- CosmoCaixa Barcelona
- CaixaForum Madrid
- CaixaForum Lleida
