= Pascal of Bollywood =

French actor and singer (born 1963)

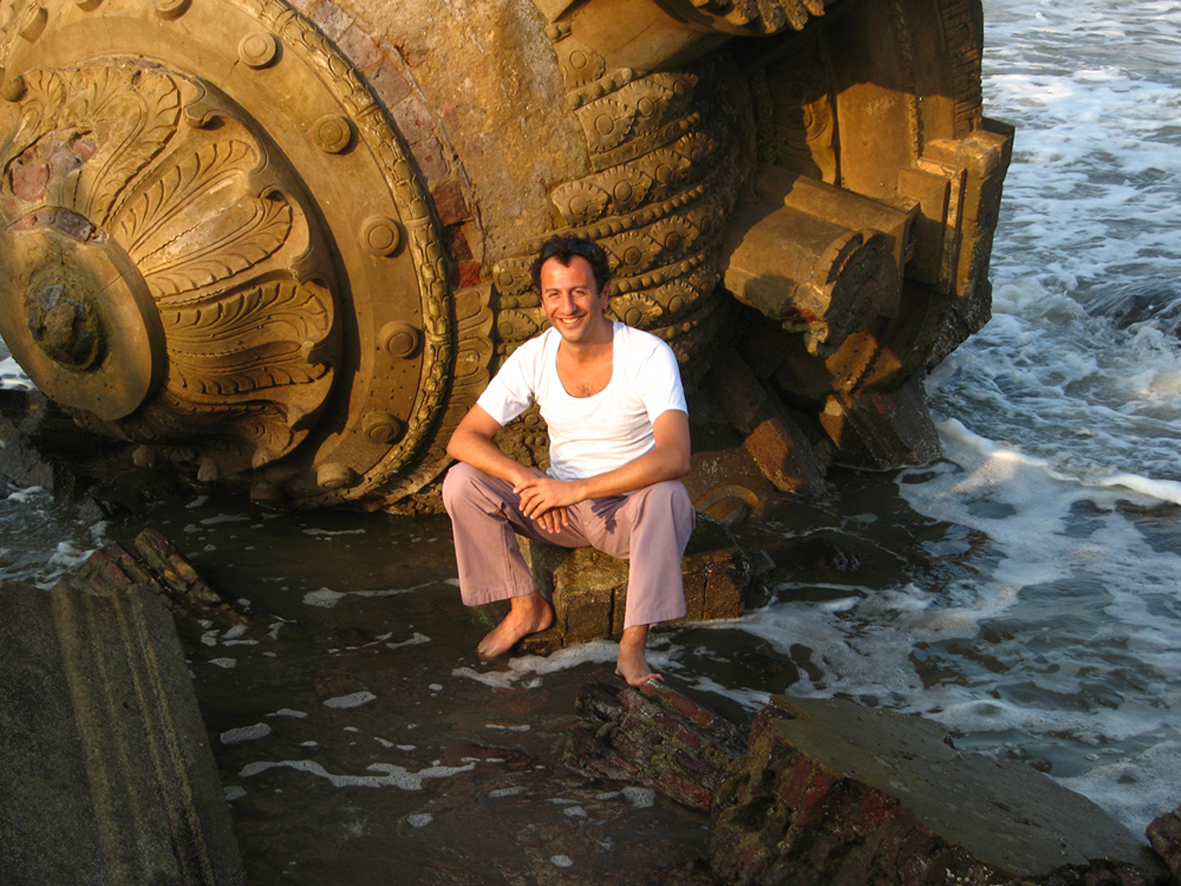
- Pascal of Bollywood at Tharangambadi- Tamil Nadu, India

Background information
- Born: Pascal Heni; 25 April 1963; Batignolles, Paris, France
- Genres: Bollywood music
- Years active: 1990–present
- Partner: Patrick Blanc

Pascal of Bollywood (born Pascal Heni; 1963) is a French actor and singer who gained fame in India as the first Westerner to reinterpret the songs of Indian cinema in Hindi, Tamil and Bengali. He is best known for his Hindi and French cover of Edith Piaf's "La Vie en rose".

== Biography ==
Pascal Heni was born in Paris in 1963 into a family of pied-noirs. His artistic career began at the age of 15 years with courses in drama and theater. While traveling in Malaysia in 1987 he heard the Hindi song "Zindagi Ek Safar Hai Suhana" from the film Andaz and became fascinated with Bollywood music. Upon his return to France he began studying Indian languages and emulating the style of Kishore Kumar, his favorite singer.

== Personal life ==
Heni has been in a relationship with French botanist Patrick Blanc since 1985.

== Discography ==
=== Albums ===
- 1990 N'êtes pas très bavard ce soir
- 1993 La vie c'est mouvant
- 1997 Casino des Trépassés
- 1998 Paradiso, canto XXXIII
- 2000 Hôtel de Bondeville
- 2002 Concerts Evolutifs
- 2003 Zindagi ek safar hai suhana
- 2004 Pascal of Bollywood
- 2005 Les Amours Jaunes
- 2007 Folies Musicales
- 2009 Retour au nom de jeune homme
- 2010 Pascal of Massilia
- 2011 Purgatorio, canto XVII
- 2011 An Evening in Paris Remix

=== Compilation albums ===
- 2004 Indomania by Béatrice Ardisson (France)
- 2005 The Best Of by Claude Challe (France)
- 2005 High Society, Amor (Italy)
- 2006 City Hippy by Pathaan (England)
- 2007 Francophonic GM record (Poland)
- 2007 Musique fantastique by DJ Guuzbourg (Netherlands)
- 2007 Pieprz i Wanilia by Stanisław Trzciński (Poland)
- 2008 Various Kampengrooves 2 (Germany)
- 2008 Cafe Latino Vol. 6 a Special Night Lounge
- 2009 Love from Jaipur by Béatrice Ardisson (France)
- 2011 Original Chill Lounge Session
- 2013 Montecarlo Nights New Classics Vol.6 (Italy)
