= La Caixa =

Spanish banking foundation

"La Caixa" Foundation
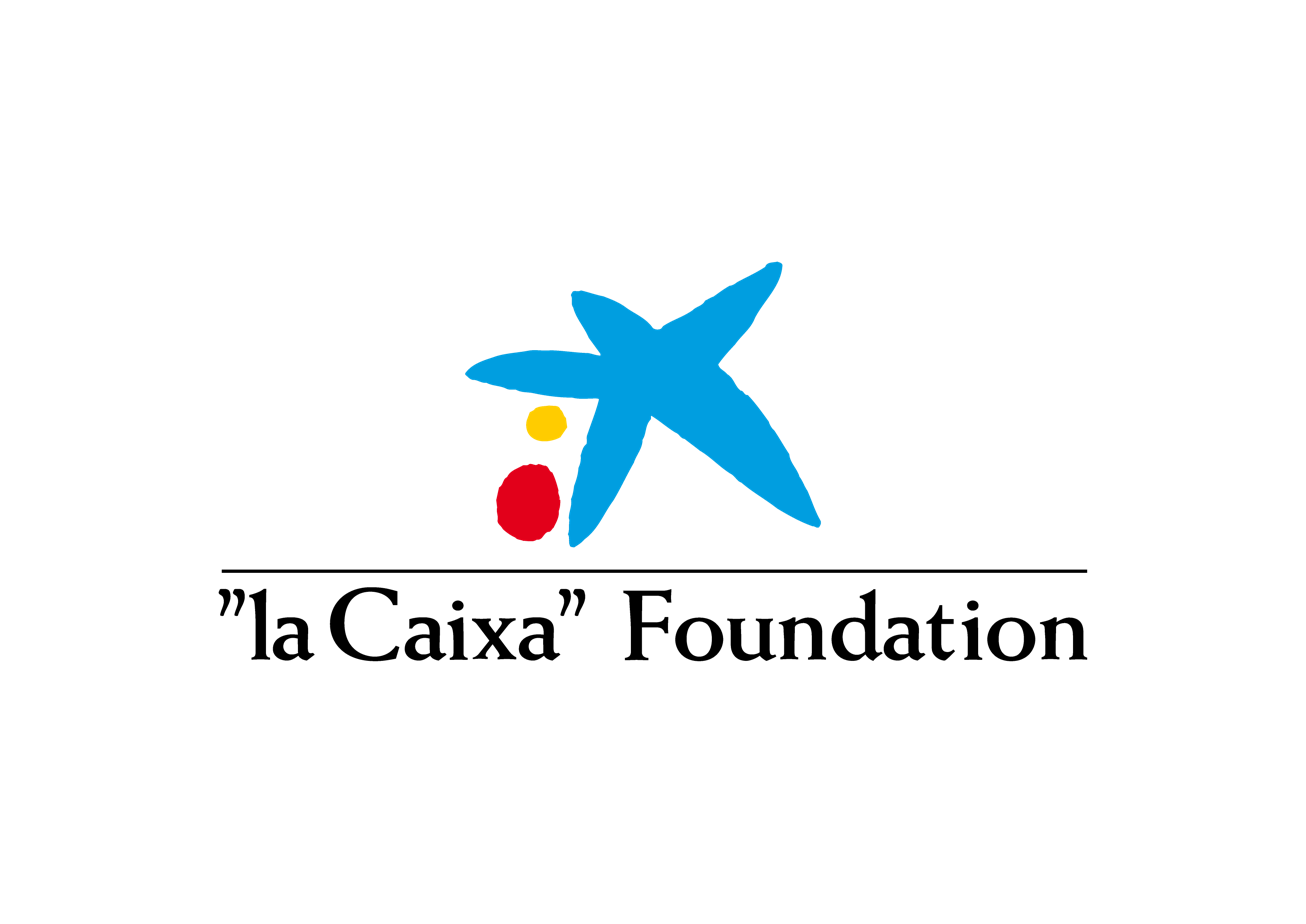

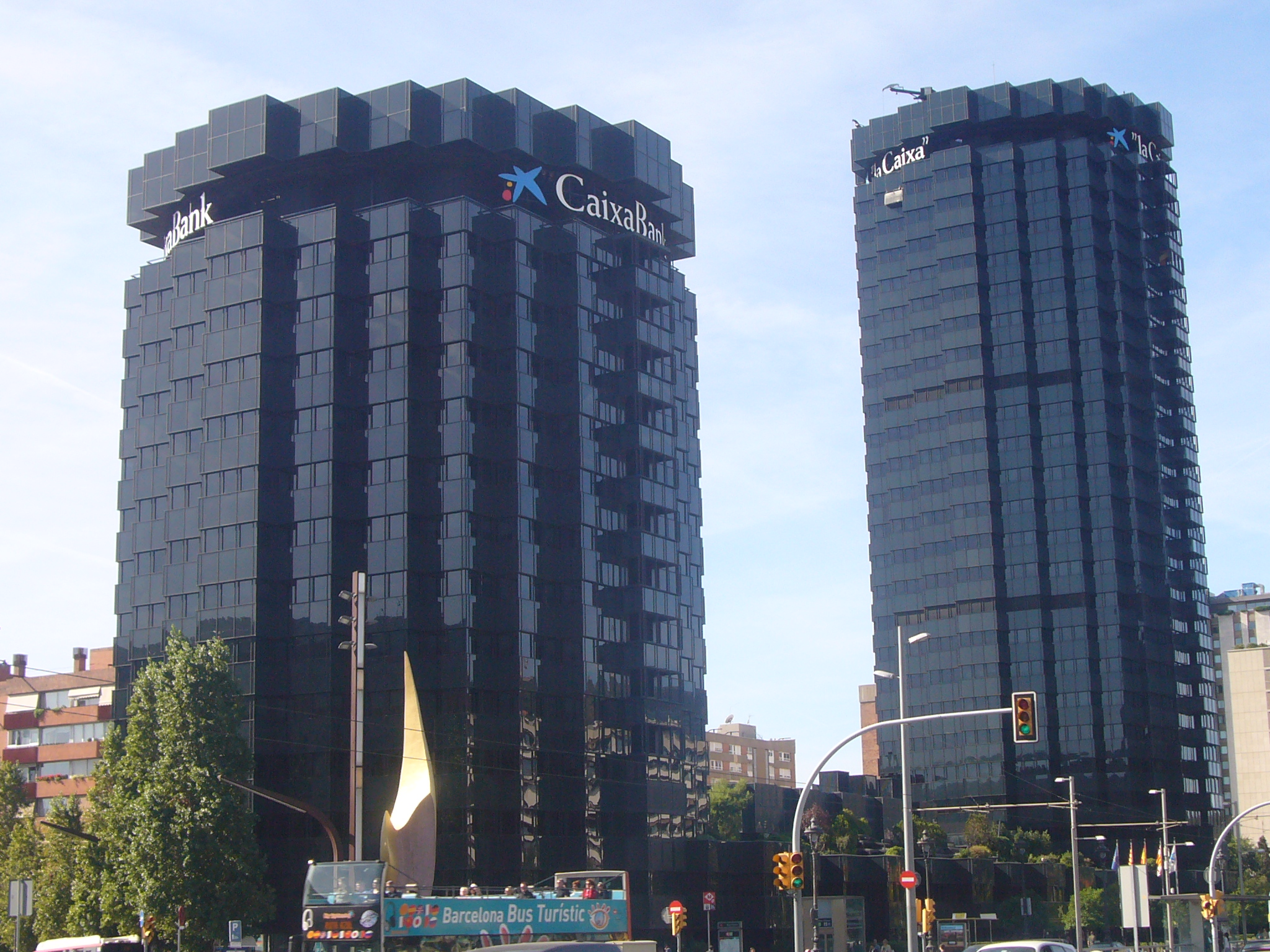
- La Caixa towers, Barcelona
- Trade name: La Caixa
- Native name: Fundació Bancaria Caixa d'Estalvis i Pensions de Barcelona, "la Caixa"
- Formerly: Caixa d'Estalvis i Pensions de Barcelona, "la Caixa"
- Type: Banking foundation (since 2014); Caixa d’estalvis (1990–2014)
- Industry: Social work; Financial services
- Predecessors: Caixa de Barcelona; Caixa de Pensions "La Caixa"
- Founded: 1990; 36 years ago
- Headquarters: Avda. Diagonal 621-629, Barcelona, Spain
- Revenue: 530,000,000 (2023)
- Total assets: 26,614,033,000 (2022)
- Website: lacaixafoundation.org/en/

La Caixa Foundation (Catalan: Fundació ”la Caixa”, Spanish: Fundación ”la Caixa”) is a not-for-profit banking foundation based in Spain, with its headquarters in Barcelona since March 2025.

Originally a savings bank (called a caixa in catalan, hence the name), it reorganized in the 2000s and 2010s. Since then, its commercial assets have been managed under its subsidiary CriteriaCaixa, which also has partial ownership of La Caixa's old banking business CaixaBank; those are used to fund La Caixa's Obra Social — social, cultural, scientific, and civic projects for the public good.

== History ==
The foundation commonly dates itself to the 1990 creation of the Caixa d'Estalvis i Pensions de Barcelona as a merger of the Caixa d'Estalvis i Mont de Pietat de Barcelona founded in 1844 and commonly known as Caixa de Barcelona, founded in 1844, with the Caixa de Pensions per a la Vellesa i d'Estalvis de Catalunya i Balears, founded in 1904 and commonly known as the Caixa de Pensions and later "La Caixa".

=== Ancestry ===
==== Caixa de Barcelona ====
At the time of the 1990 merger, the Caixa de Barcelona was the third largest savings bank in Spain.

==== Caixa de Pensions ====
The Caixa de Pensions per a la Vellesa (English: Old Age Pension Society) was formed in 1904 in Catalonia by Francesc Moragas, and opened to the public in 1905, expanding to the Balearic Islands in 1915. It merged with the Caixa d’Estalvis del Empordà in 1915, taking on the name "Caixa de Pensions per a la Vellesa i d’Estalvis".

The Obra Social was formally created in 1918 to oversee the Caixa's social work.

By 1930, the Caixa had been reformed 15 times by mergers with other organizations; the first outside of Catalonia was the Caixa Rural per a la Federació Catòlic-Agraria d’Eivissa in 1930.

In 1969, the Caixa de Pensions became the first in Europe to begin real-time computerized tele-processing of transactions, allowing customers to do banking at any branch at will.

In the late 1980s, the Caixa de Pensions, by then commonly known as "La Caixa", began work to expand outside of its usual territory: In 1986 it formed GrupCaixa to get around then-restrictive geographic limitations in the law; GrupCaixa was folded back into La Caixa in 1989 when the limitations were removed.

By the time of the 1990 merger, La Caixa was already the largest savings bank in Spain.

=== 1990 organization ===
On 27 July 1990, the Caixa de Barcelona, and La Caixa, also formerly called the Caixa de Pensions, merged to form the Caixa d’Estalvis y Pensions de Barcelona, which itself continued the name "La Caixa".

In 1995, La Caixa opened the first international representative offices in Porto, Portugal and Brussels, Belgium.

In November 2006, the Board of Directors of La Caixa approved the IPO of its investee portfolio, through the company Criteria CaixaCorp, which became effective on 10 October 2007.

In January 2008, La Caixa bought part of Morgan Stanley's private banking business in Spain for almost 600 million euros and in 2010, the group acquired Caixa Girona, being one of the three savings bank integration operations that did not require assistance from the FROB (Fund for the orderly restructuring of the banking sector).

On 29 January 2008, Criteria CaixaCorp was included in IBEX 35. In addition, La Caixa acquired 14.91% of Bank of East Asia's capital.

It has a portfolio of industrial holdings in companies in the infrastructure, energy and communications sectors, among others.

=== Segregation of the banking business at CaixaBank and restructuring of the group ===
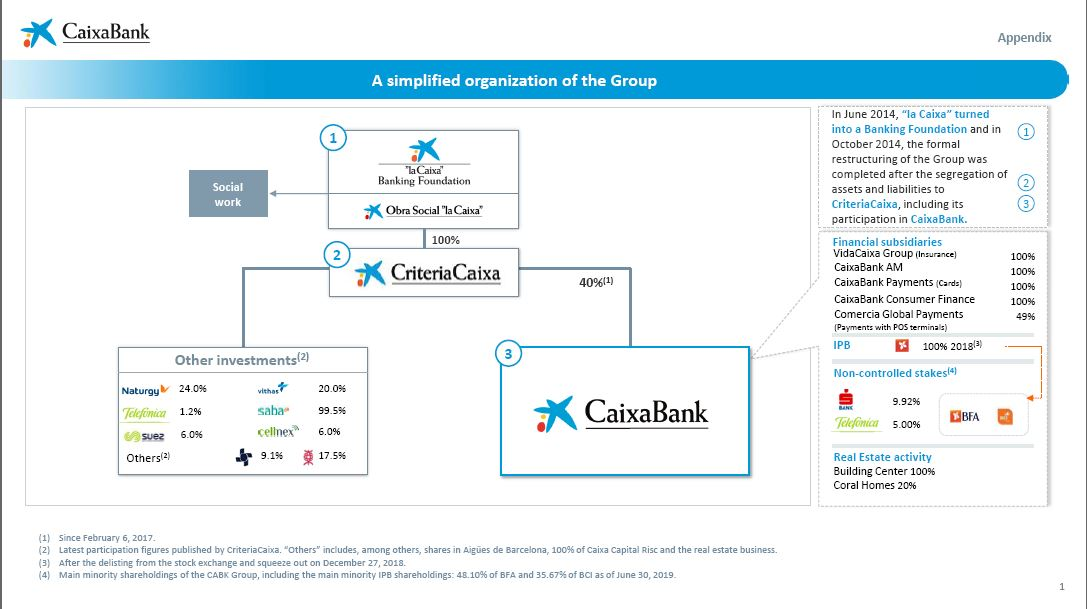
Structure of La Caixa Group after its restructuring in 2010

On 27 January 2011, within the context of the restructuring of the financial system in Spain, the board of directors of La Caixa unveiled a complete reorganization of the group. The savings bank would transfer its banking business (office network, client portfolio, assets, and bank capital) entirely to a subsidiary in which the majority of shares are held by the same savings bank (74%), which adopted the name of CaixaBank, and was formerly known as Criteria CaixaCorp.

La Caixa ceased to conduct retail banking business, and its only activity was limited to the maintenance of the La Caixa Social Work Project. Although the savings bank no longer operates financially, CaixaBank decided, in its offices and in the commercial relationship with its customers, to use the commercial pseudonym of La Caixa, leaving the brand "CaixaBank" solely for institutional use.

At the same time, in July 2011, another subsidiary of the group was created, in this case 100% owned by La Caixa, called Criteria CaixaHolding, which would not list on the stock exchange and would bring together the less attractive stocks such as real estate services (Servihabitat), industrial holdings (Gas Natural Fenosa and Abertis) and PortAventura World. CaixaBank, which is publicly traded, remained at the helm of the banking business, the insurer (SegurCaixa) and the more financially attractive shares in foreign banks and in Telefónica and Repsol.

In September 2011, CaixaBank acquired Bankpyme's banking and fund management business.

In March 2012, the group announced an agreement whereby it acquired for 979 million euros and subsequently integrated within CaixaBank the SIP (Institutional Protection Scheme) formed by Cajasol (including Caja de Guadalajara), Caja Navarra, CajaCanarias and Caja de Burgos, commercially known until then as Banca Cívica (Civic Bank). The Civic Bank brand was discarded and the SIP was liquidated, transferring its clients, offices and assets to CaixaBank. However, due to its cultural roots, the entity decided to maintain the savings banks' logos that gave rise to the integration in its offices and communications in the offices, combining them with that of the Catalan bank, but only in the territories of influence of each entity.

On 12 June 2013 the General Shareholders' Meeting of Banc de València approved its integration into CaixaBank. It was agreed to maintain the Banc de València brand in the offices held by the bank in the provinces of València and Castelló with a dual label to indicate that they also belong to CaixaBank.

On 19 July 2013 the merger deed of Banc de València and CaixaBank was registered in the commercial register, and the integration of Banc de València into CaixaBank became fully effective.

After the absorption of Banc de València by CaixaBank, both the offices of La Caixa and those of Banc de València in the Region of Murcia regained the name Banco de Murcia, next to the star denoting La Caixa.

=== Transformation into a banking foundation ===
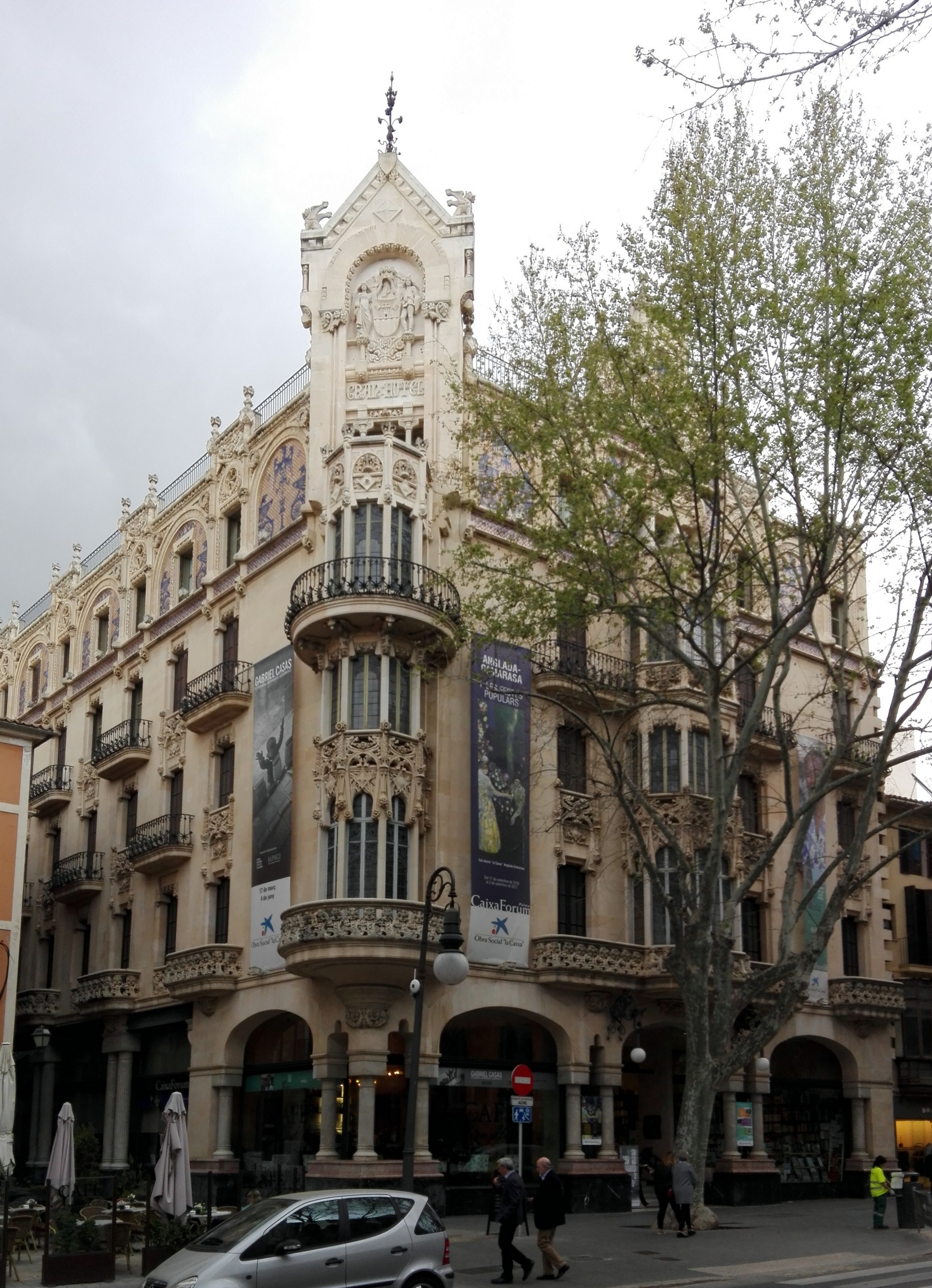
CaixaForum Palma, former Gran Hotel, now La Caixa Foundation headquarters, in Palma de Mallorca

On 10 April 2014 it was announced that its transformation into a banking foundation would be decided at the ordinary general meeting on May 22 to comply with the Savings Banks and Banking Foundations Law, which requires savings banks with indirect banking activity to be liquidated and transformed into foundations, responsible for managing social work projects. This would lead to a process of reorganization within the group, which would involve, on the one hand, the dissolution and liquidation of the La Caixa Foundation and, on the other hand, the transfer to Criteria CaixaHolding (100% of La Caixa) of the participation in CaixaBank.

On 22 May 2014, the general assembly of La Caixa approved its transformation into a banking foundation.

The foundation was established on 17 June 2014. As a result, on the one hand, the dissolution and liquidation of the La Caixa Foundation would occur, with the overall transfer of its assets and liabilities in favour of the La Caixa Banking Foundation, and, on the other hand, the transfer in favour of Criteria CaixaHolding of the participation of the Caixa at CaixaBank, so that the banking foundation would go on to hold its stake in CaixaBank through Criteria CaixaHolding, and the debt instruments of which La Caixa was the issuer. In this way, the group led by the new La Caixa Banking Foundation would have as main activities: the management of the entire Social Work, those of a financial nature related to the management of its participation in CaixaBank, the administration of the debt instruments that have La Caixa as an issuer, and the management of investments in industries other than finance grouped so far in Criteria CaixaHolding. The liquidation of the La Caixa Foundation took place on 16 October 2014 while the transfer of the stake in CaixaBank took place on 14 October 2014.

On 26 June 2014, the president of CaixaBank and until then president of the savings bank, Isidro Fainé, was elected president of the Board of Trustees of the La Caixa Banking Foundation.

== Participation ==
The La Caixa Banking Foundation manages the Group's shareholdings through Criteria Caixa (formerly Criteria CaixaHolding), an equity instrumental company fully controlled by the foundation. The shares of Criteria Caixa include the ones owned in CaixaBank (as of 31 December 2018: 40.00%), as well as those held in several companies including Cellnex, Naturgy, Saba, Suez and Telefónica.

== Social work ==
As explained above, since September 2014, La Caixa Banking Foundation is responsible for managing the social work projects of the former savings bank. Until then, this work was carried out by the La Caixa Foundation.

In 2018, the La Caixa Banking Foundation had an allocated budget of 520 million euros. The foundation, one of the most significant worldwide, supported more than 11 million people in 2017, through nearly 50,000 initiatives. According to the OECD, La Caixa Banking Foundation's financing for 2019 development increased by 58% to US$33.9 million.

== Merger with Bankia (including the former CajaMadrid) ==
On September 3, 2020, it was announced that CaixaBank and Bankia were studying their merger to create the largest bank in Spain. The Spanish State would go from owning 61.8% of Bankia to 14% of the merged entity, whose main shareholder would be the "la Caixa" Foundation, which would have around 30%.

The resulting entity would have assets worth more than 650,000 million euros, some 6,600 branches and a workforce of more than 51,000 employees. On March 26, the merger deed was registered in the Mercantile Registry of València, the Bankia shares stopped trading and on March 29, the new CaixaBank shares which the owners of the now-defunct nationalized entity would receive began to be quoted. Finally, after the operation, the "la Caixa" Foundation (through Criteria Caixa) would own 30.012% of CaixaBank and the state-owned FROB (through BFA Tenedora de Acciones) 16.117%.

== Shareholders ==
Following the merger by absorption of Bankia by CaixaBank, Criteria Caixa (and, therefore, the "la Caixa" Foundation) came to own 30.012% of the entity. On the other hand, the Spanish State, through the FROB and its company BFA Tenedora de Acciones, became a shareholder in the entity with 16.117%.

As of June 30, 2023, after a capital reduction, both the Government of Spain and the "la Caixa" Foundation increased their participation, remaining as follows:

• "la Caixa" Foundation: 32.2%.

• FROB: 17.3%

• Floating capital: 50.3%

• Treasury stock and Board of Directors: 0.1%

== See also ==
- CaixaForum
- CriteriaCaixa
