= List of places in Jerusalem =

This article lists significant public places in the city of Jerusalem.

== Neighborhoods ==
- Abu Tor
- at-Tur
- Arnona (Old Talpiot)
- Ar-Ram
- Atarot
- Bab a-Zahara
- Baka
- Batei Munkacs
- Batei Saidoff
- Batei Ungarin
- Bayit VeGan
- Beit HaKerem
- Beit Hanina
- Beit Safafa
- Beit Yisrael
- Bukharim
- East Talpiot (Armon Hanetziv)
- Ein Kerem
- Etz Chaim
- Ezrat Torah
- Ezrat Yisrael
- French Hill
- German Colony
- Geula
- Gilo
- Givat Masua
- Givat Oranim
- Givat HaMatos
- Givat HaVradim
- Givat Mordechai
- Givat Ram
- Givat Shapira (French Hill)
- Givat Shaul
- Greek Colony
- Har Homa
- Har Nof
- Ir David
- Ir Ganim
- Al-Issawiya
- Jabel Mukaber
- Har Hazeitim
- Katamon (Old Katamon)
- Kerem Avraham
- Kiryat Belz
- Kiryat Hayovel
- Kiryat Mattersdorf
- Kiryat Menachem
- Kiryat Moshe
- Kiryat Sanz
- Kiryat Shmuel
- Kiryat Wolfson
- Machane Yehuda
- Machane Yisrael
- Malha
- Mamilla
- Mazkeret Moshe
- Meah Shearim
- Mekor Baruch
- Mekor Chaim
- Mishkenot Sha'ananim
- Motza
- Mount Scopus
- Mount of Olives
- Mount Zion
- Musrara
- Nachlaot
- Nahalat Shiva
- Neve Granot
- Neve Sha'anan
- Neve Yaakov
- Nayot
- Old City
  - Armenian Quarter
  - Christian Quarter
    - The Muristan
  - Jewish Quarter
    - The Cardo
    - Moroccan Quarter
  - Muslim Quarter
- Pat
- Pisgat Ze'ev
- Ramat Denya
- Ramat Sharett
- Ramat Shlomo
- Ramot
  - Ramot Polin
- Ramot Eshkol
- Rassco
- Rehavia
- Romema
- Russian Compound
- San Simon
- Sanhedria
- Sanhedria Murchevet
- Sheikh Jarrah
- Shmuel HaNavi
- Shuafat
- Silwan
- Sur Baher
- Talbiya
- Talpiot
- Tel Arza
- Umm Tuba
- Unsdorf
- Wadi al-Joz
- Yefeh Nof
- Yemin Moshe
- Zichron Moshe
- Zichron Yosef

== Major thoroughfares ==
- Bethlehem Road (part of Highway 60)
- Hebron Road-King David Street-Bar-Lev Boulevard
- Begin Expressway
- Ben Yehuda Street
- Emek Refaim Street
- Golomb-Herzog-Ben-Zvi Boulevard
- Herzl Boulevard
- Jaffa Road
- King George Street
- Gaza Street
- Keren HaYesod Street
- Yigael Yadin Boulevard
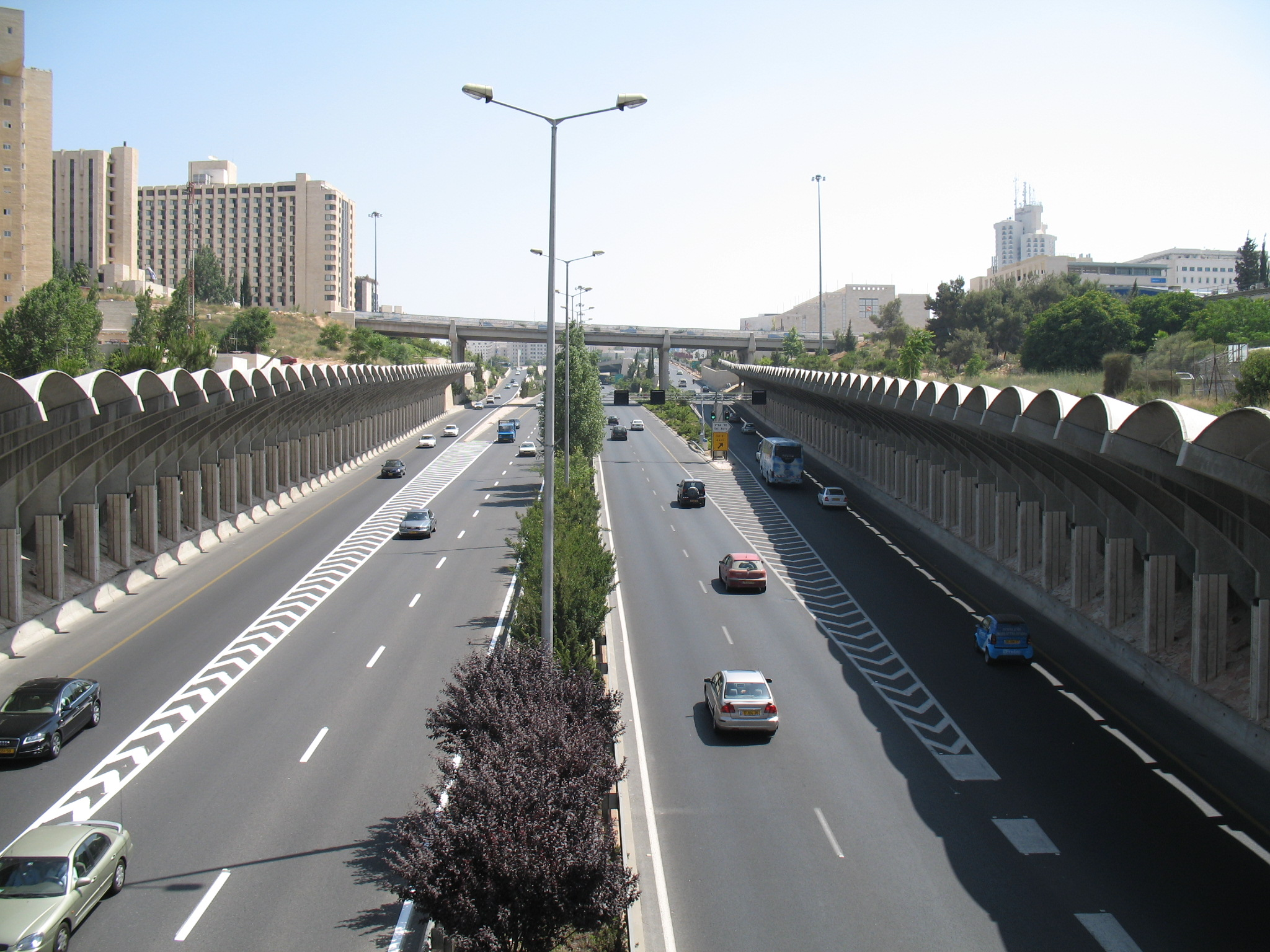
Begin Expressway with noise barriers

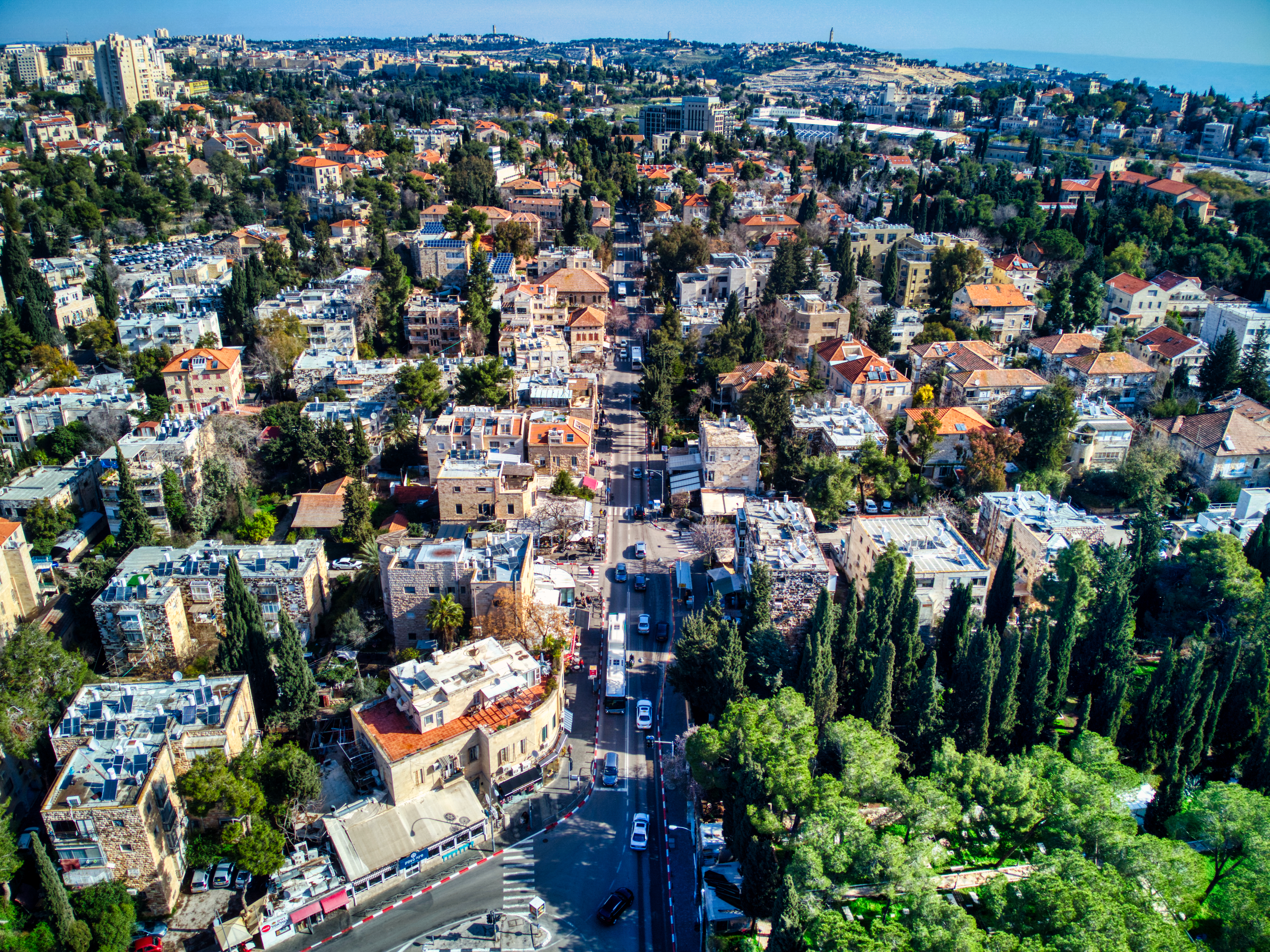
Emek Refaim street, Jerusalem

== Landmarks ==
- American Colony
- Menachem Begin Heritage Center
- Chords Bridge
- David's Citadel
- Jerusalem YMCA
- Jerusalem War Cemetery
- Montefiore Windmill
- Mormon University, Mt. Scopus
- Russian Compound
- Safra Square
- Tolerance Monument
- Yad Kennedy
- Yad Vashem
- Teddy Fountain
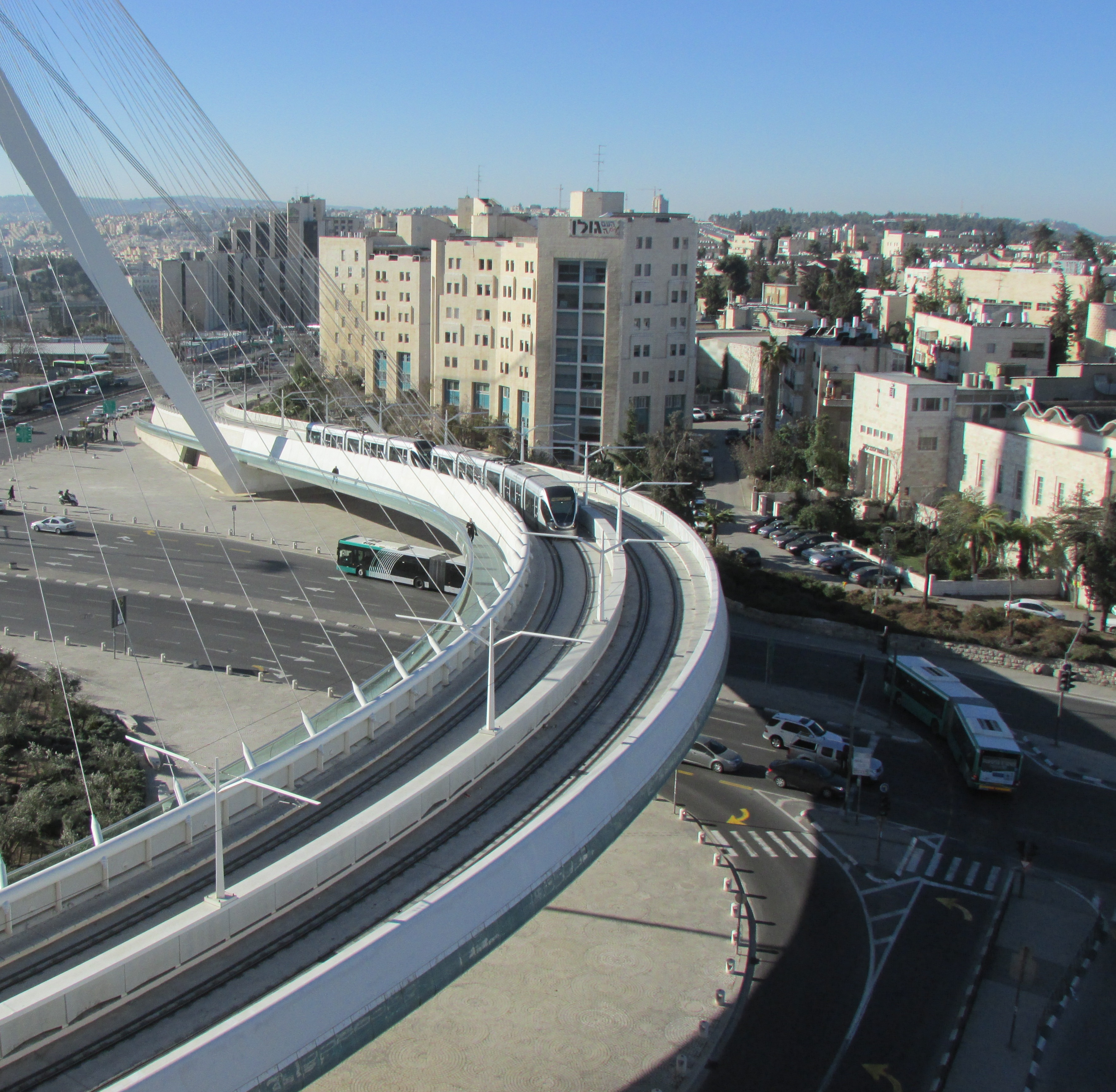
Chords Bridge

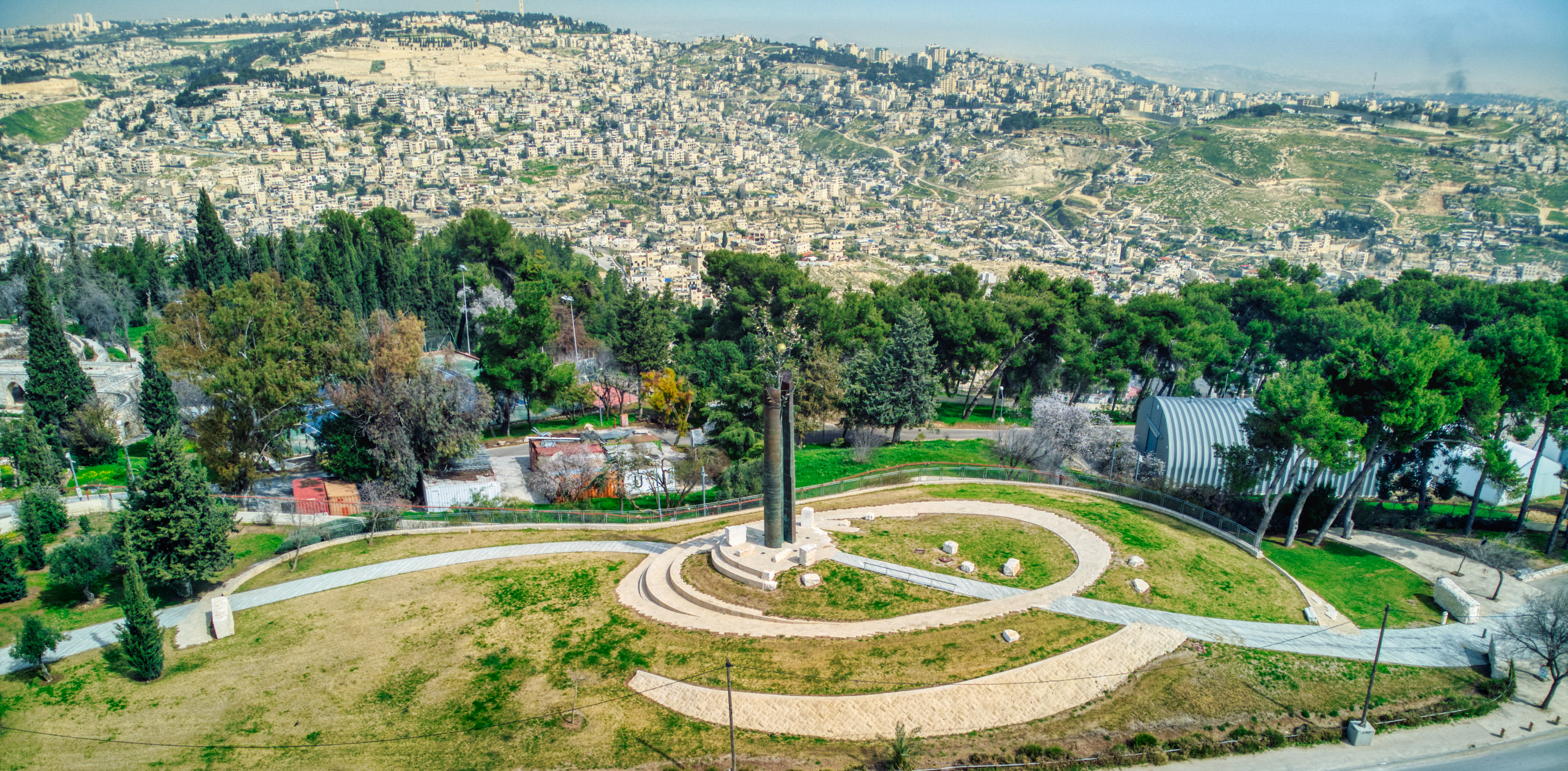
Tolerance Monument

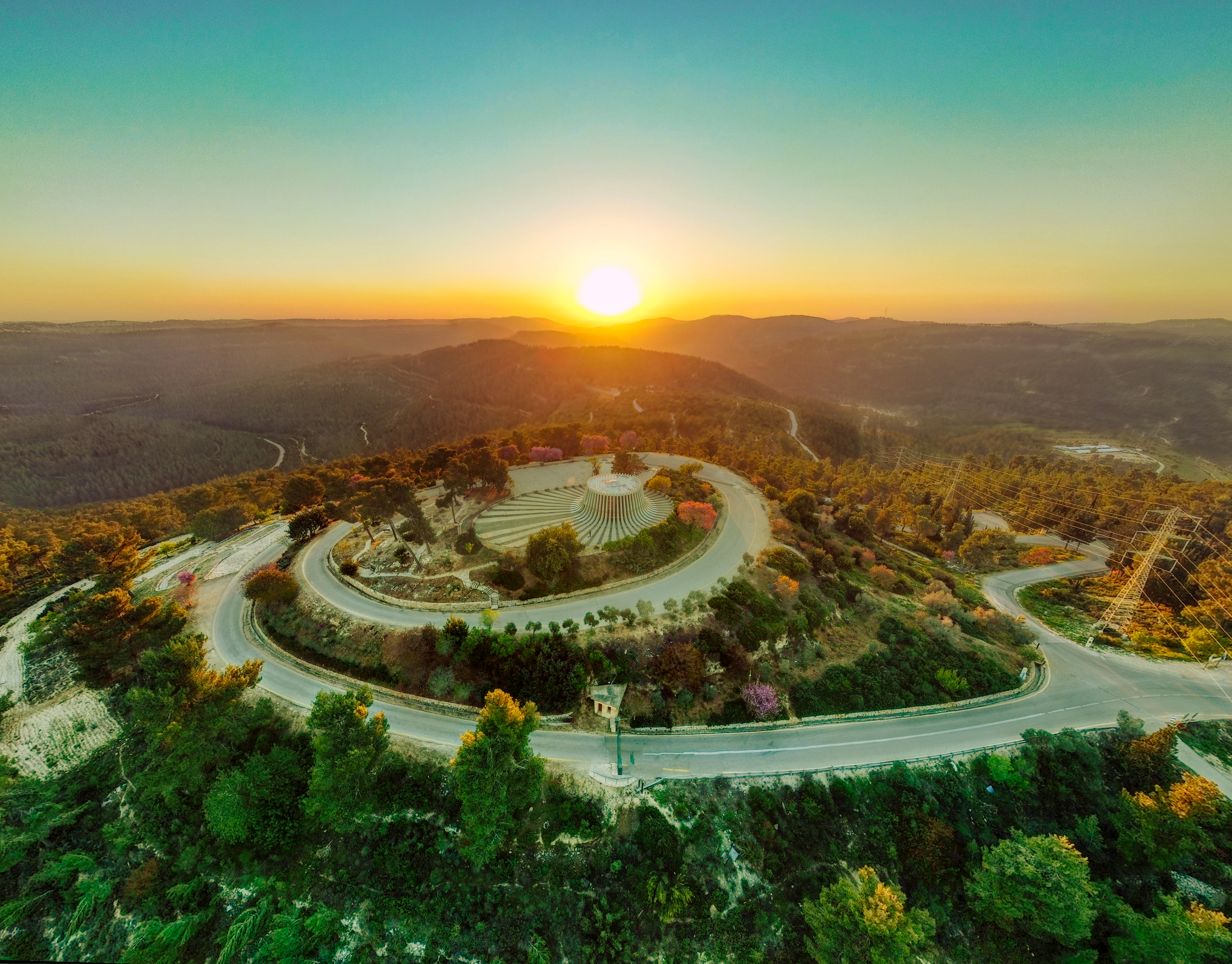
Yad Kennedy in sunset

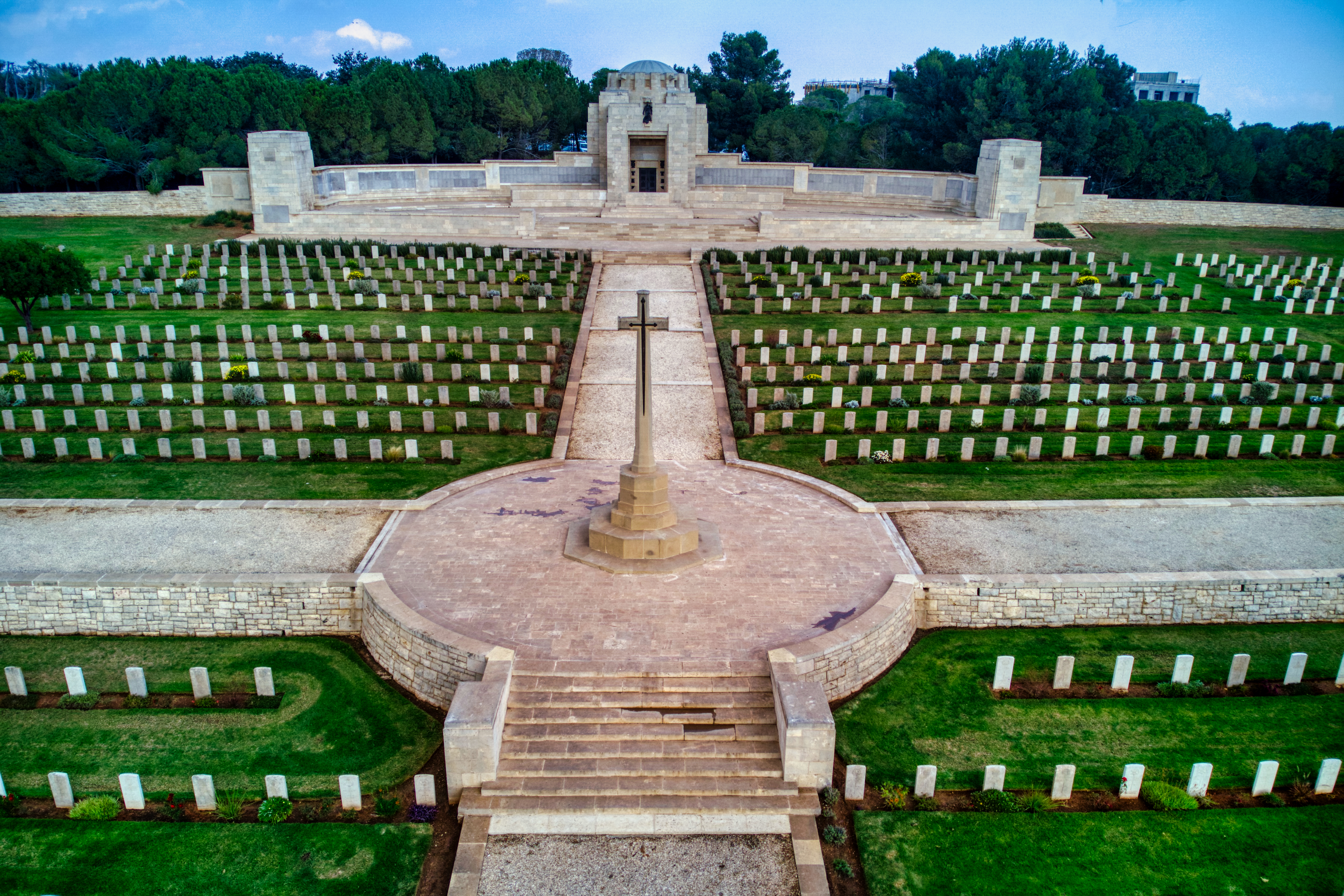
Jerusalem War Cemetery

== Parks ==
- Ammunition Hill
- Independence Park
- Jerusalem Botanical Gardens
- Gilo Park
- HaMifletzet Park (Monster Park) with Niki de Saint Phalle's Golem
- Liberty Bell Park
- Nayot Park
- Peace Forest
- Ramat Denya Park
- Sacher Park
- Sherover Promenade
- Train Track Park
- Valley of the Cross
- Wohl Rose Garden
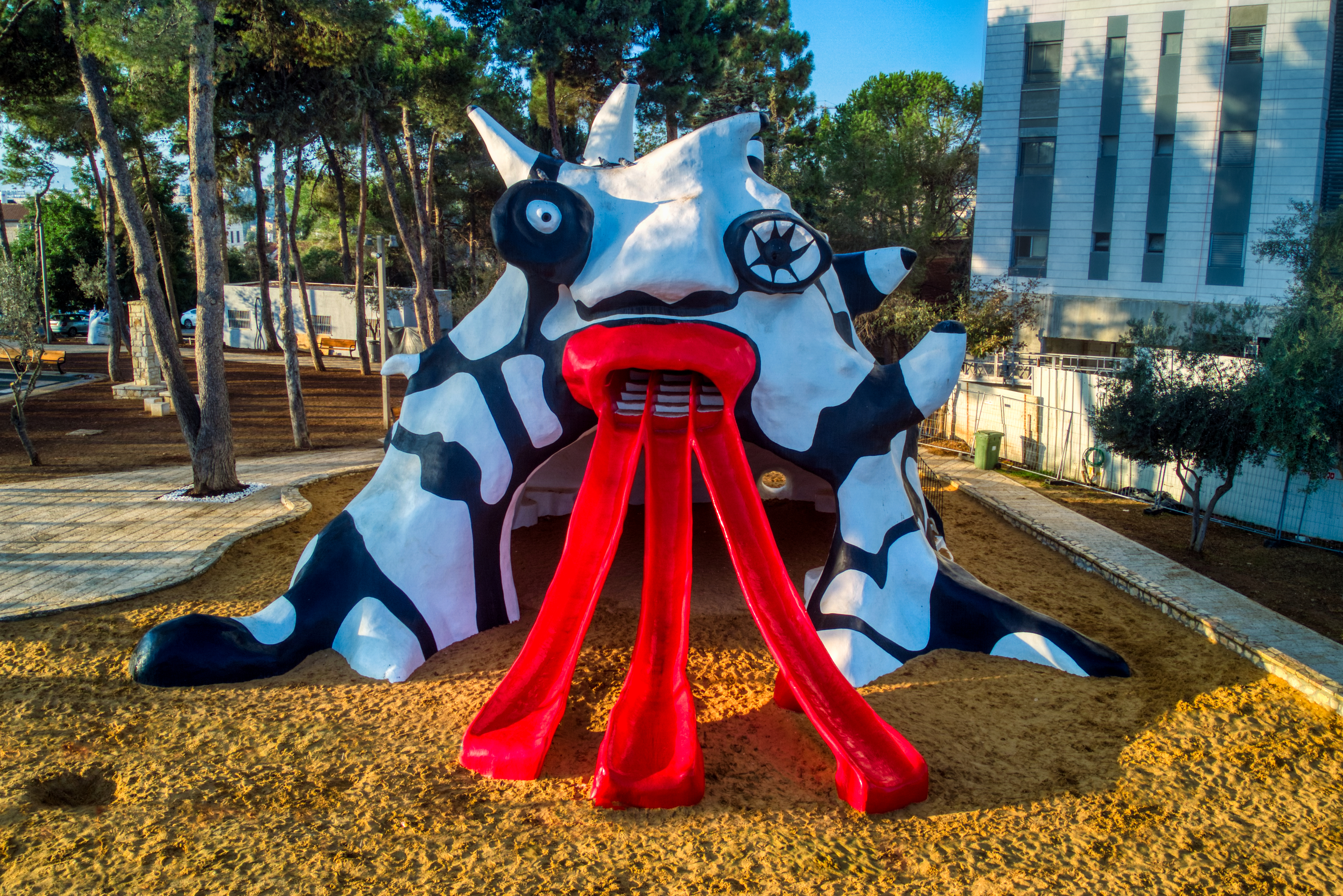
The Golem, known as "the Monster"

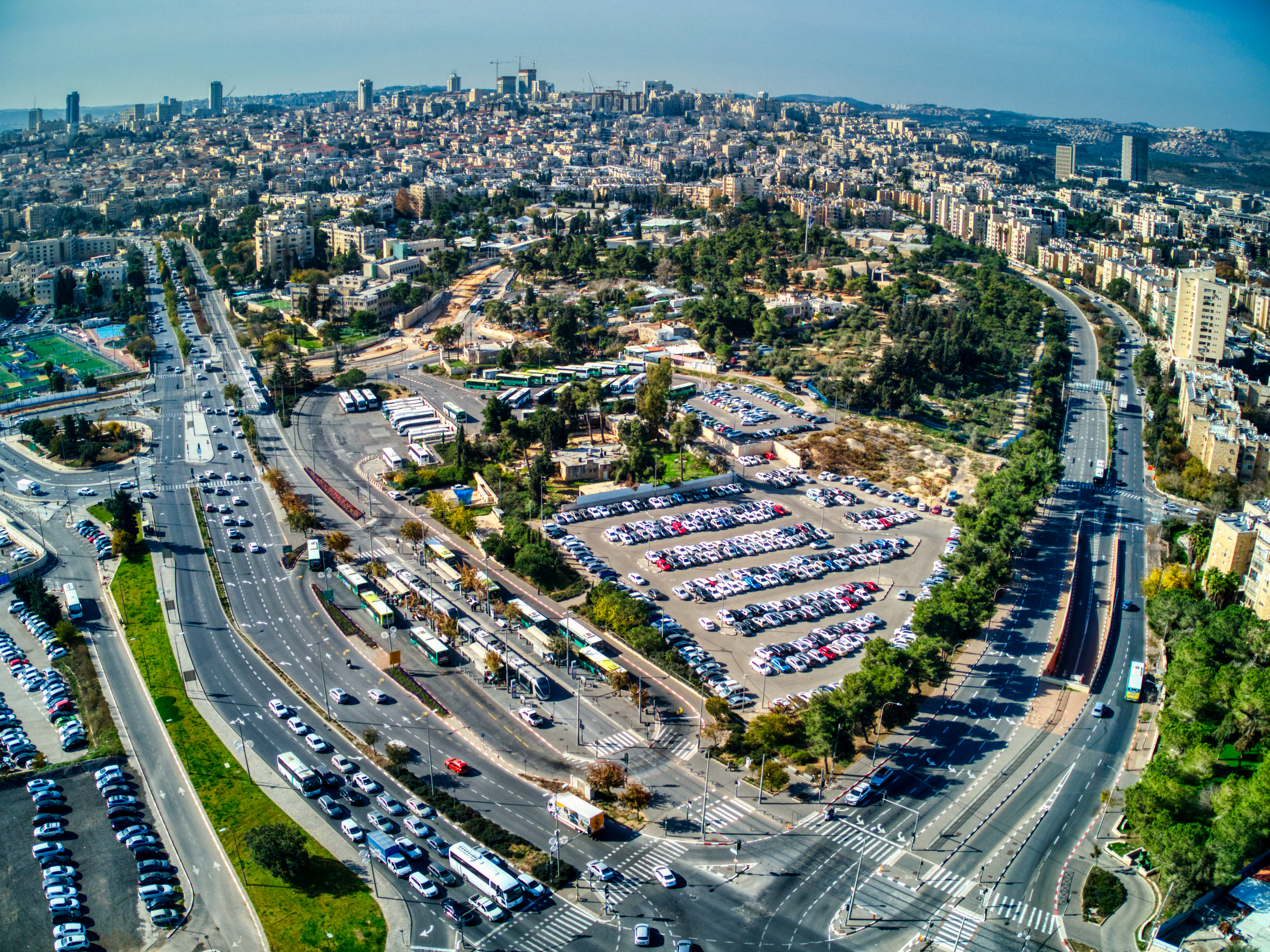
Ammunition Hill

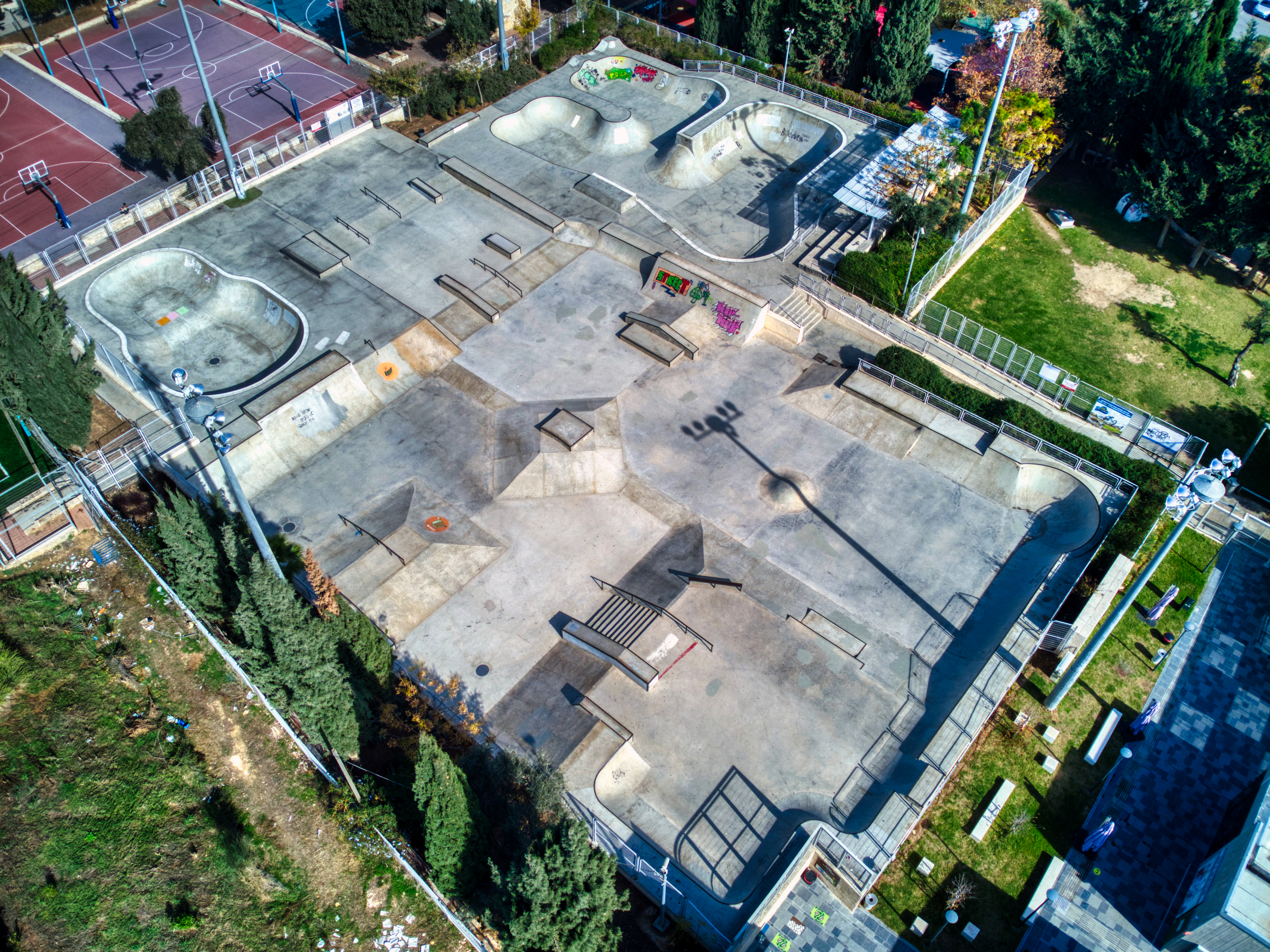
Skatepark in Liberty Bell Park

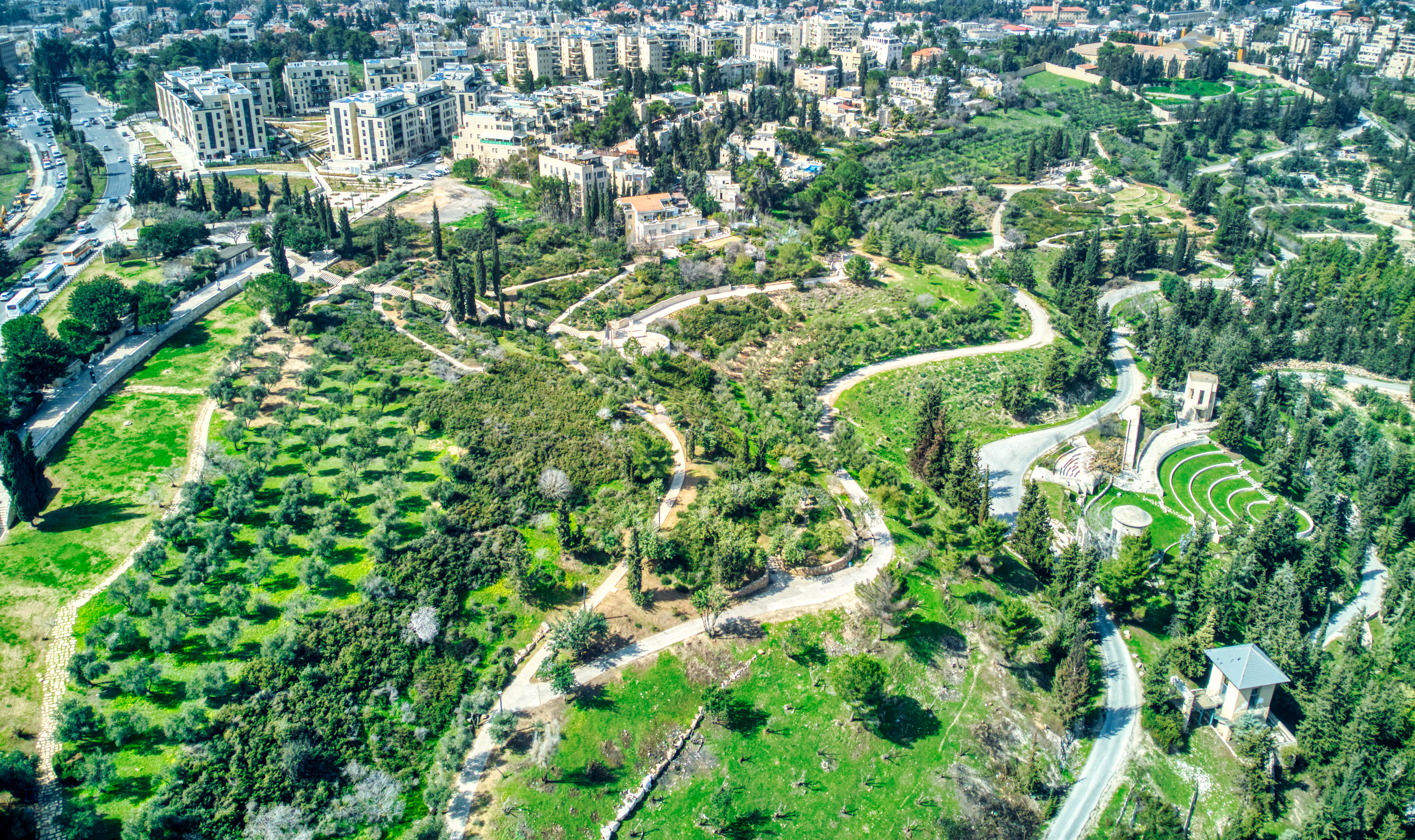
Sherover Promenade

== Ancient tombs ==
- Cave of the Ramban
- David's Tomb
- Garden Tomb
- Herod Family Tomb
- Holy Sepulchre
- Jason's Tomb
- Tomb of Absalom
- Tomb of Simeon the Just
- Tomb of the Prophets Haggai, Zechariah and Malachi
- Tomb of the Virgin Mary
- Tomb of Zechariah
- Tombs of the Kings
- Tombs of the Sanhedrin
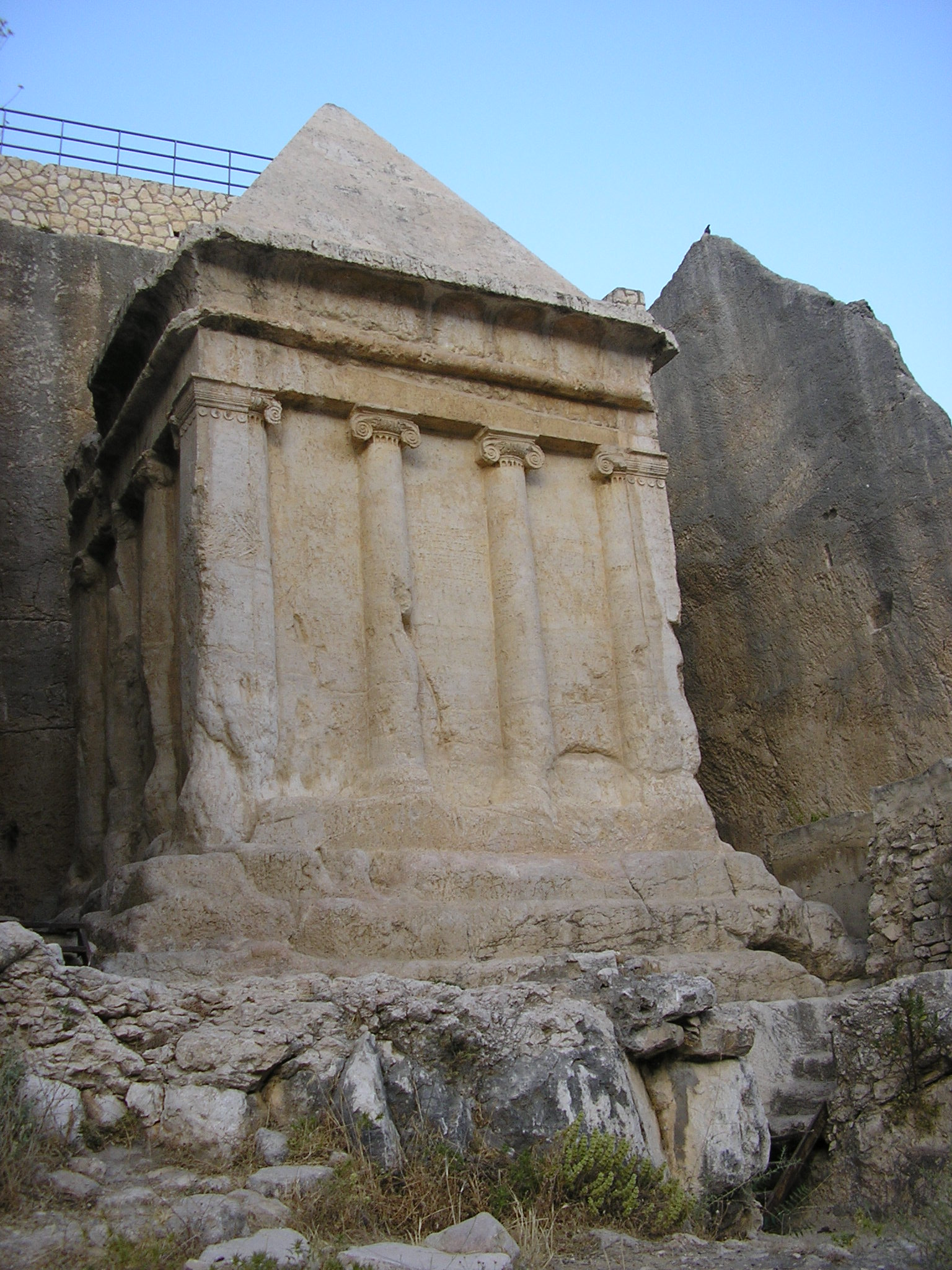
Tomb of Zechariah

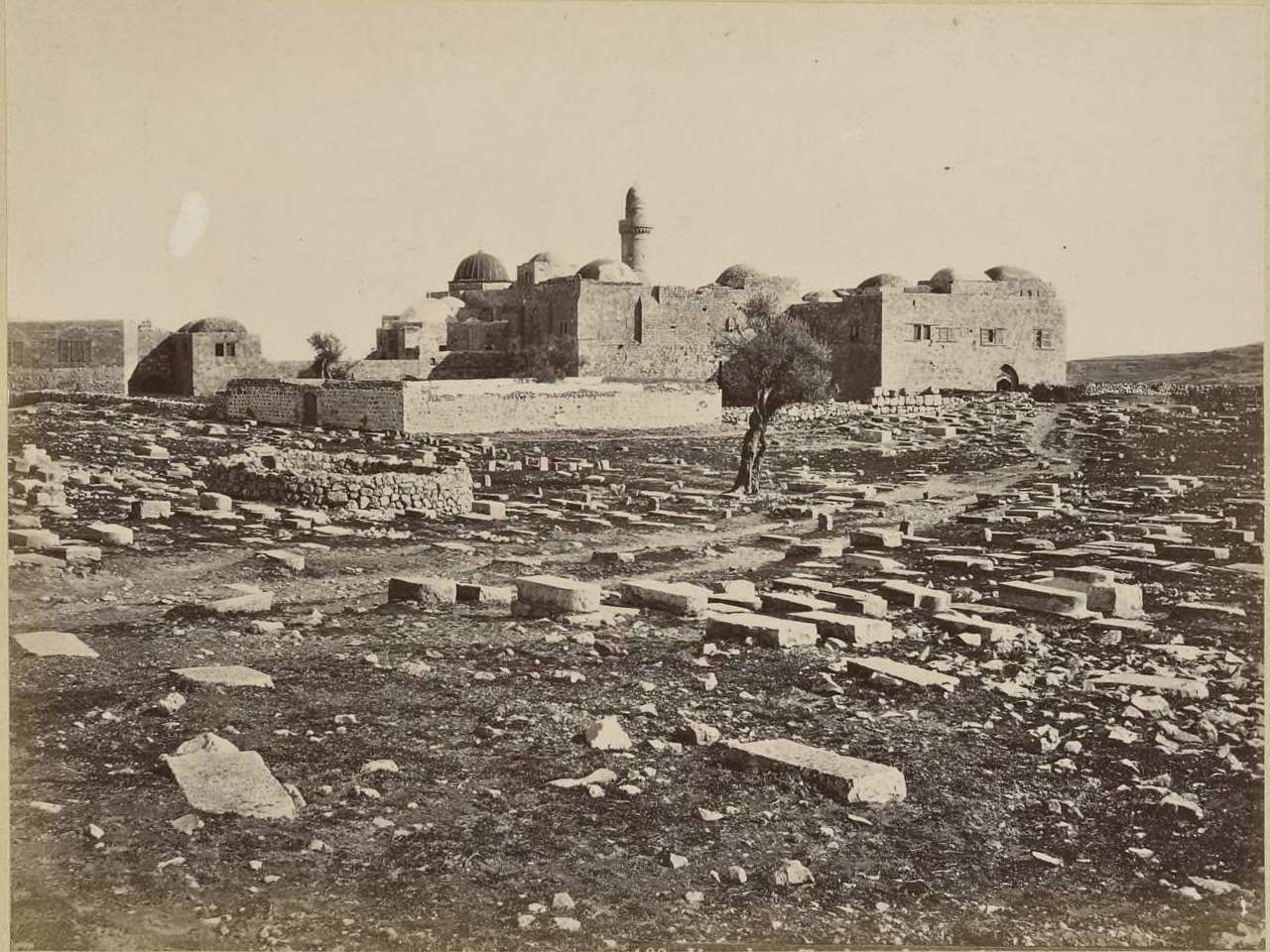
David's Tomb

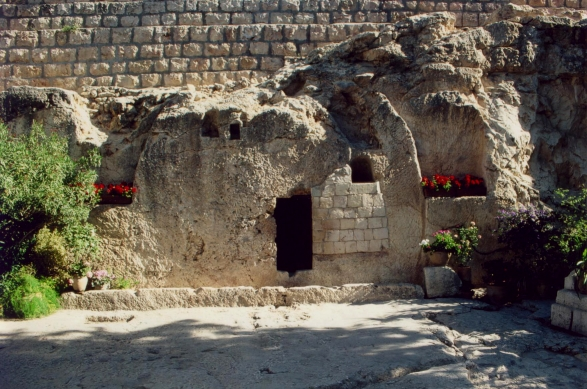
Garden Tomb

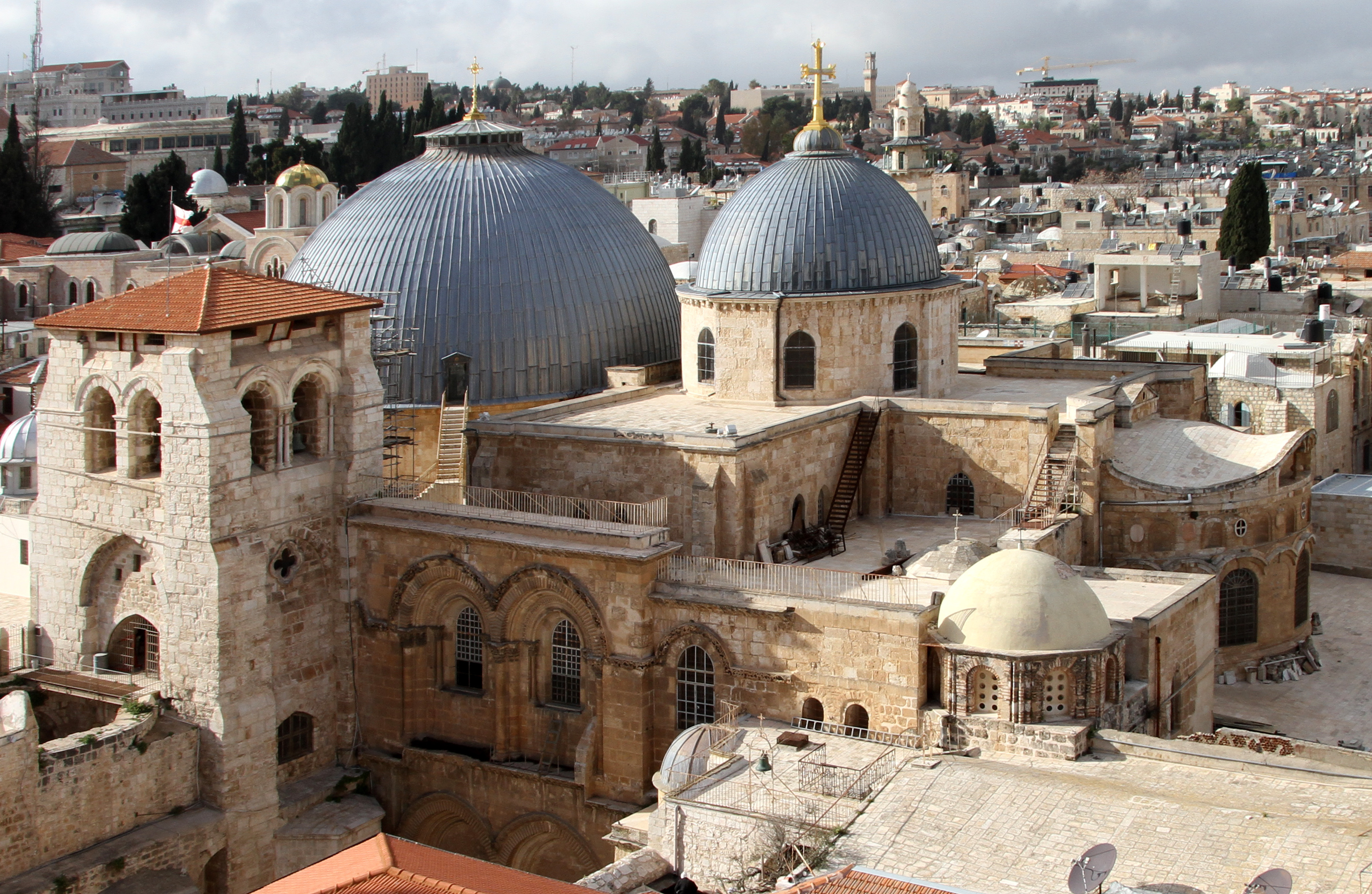
Church of the Holy Sepulchre

== Caves, tunnels and quarries ==
- Siloam Tunnel
- Warren's Shaft
- Zedekiah's Cave
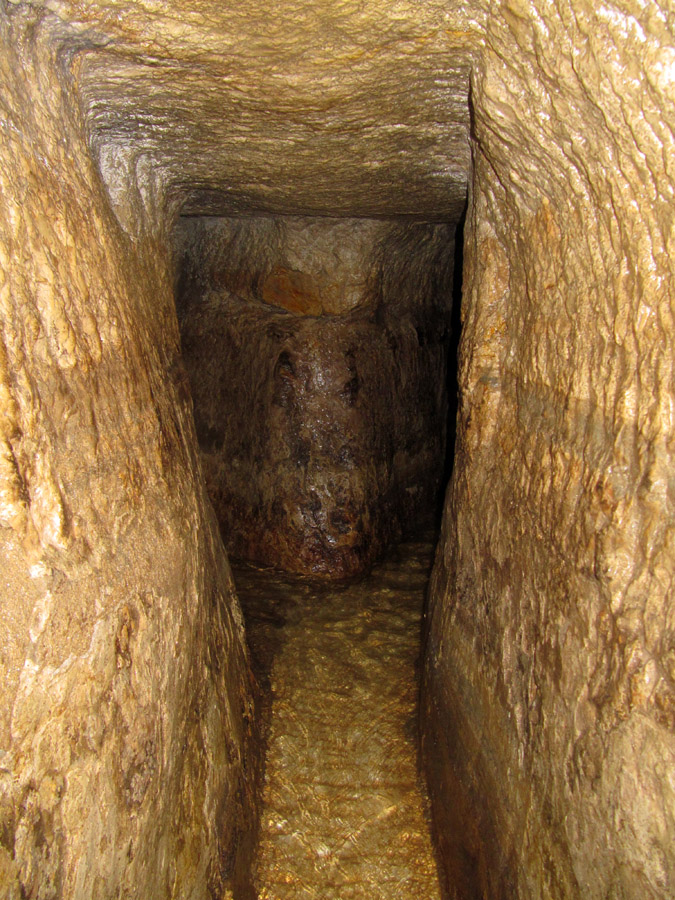
Siloam Tunnel

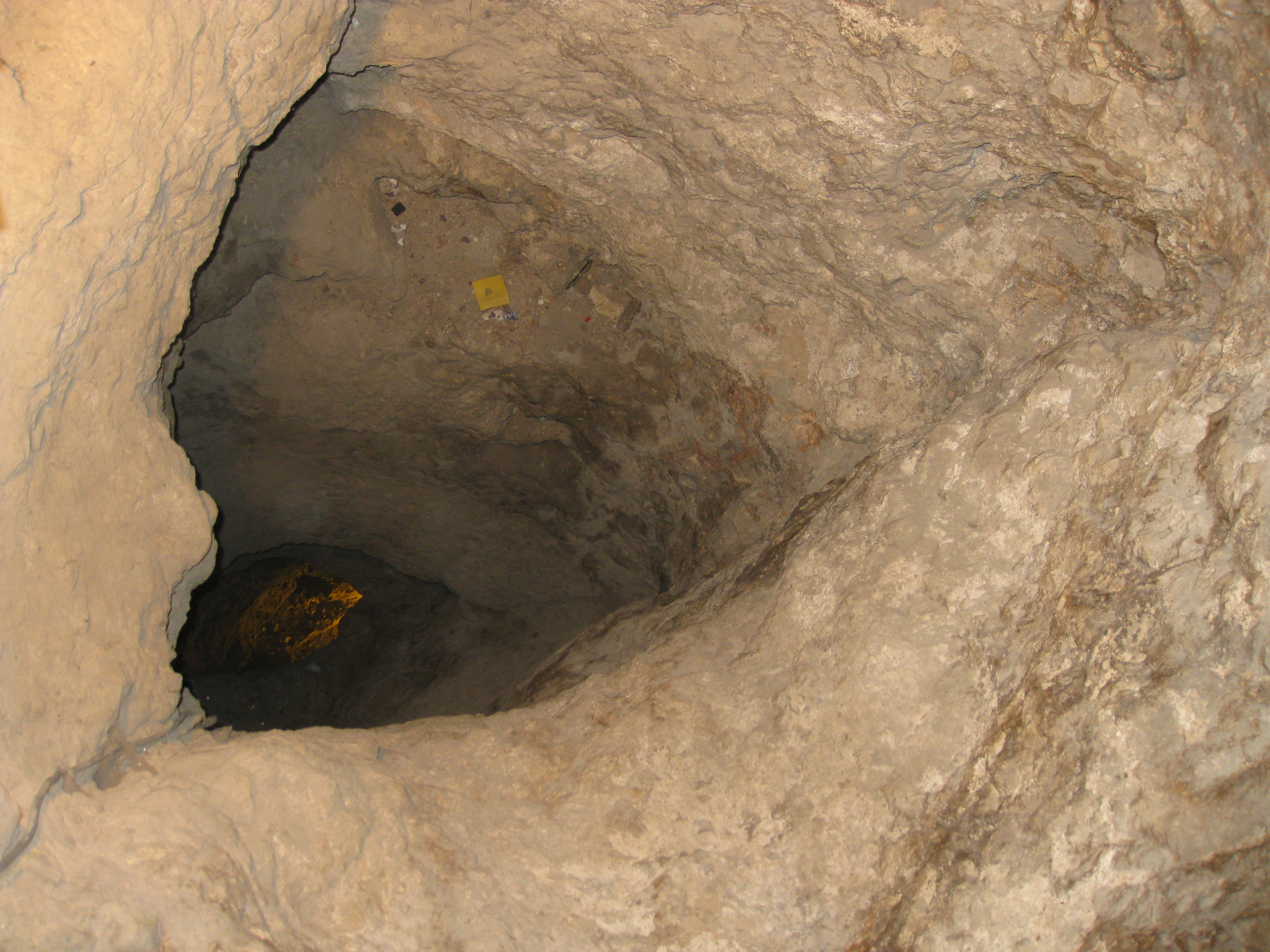
Warren's Shaft

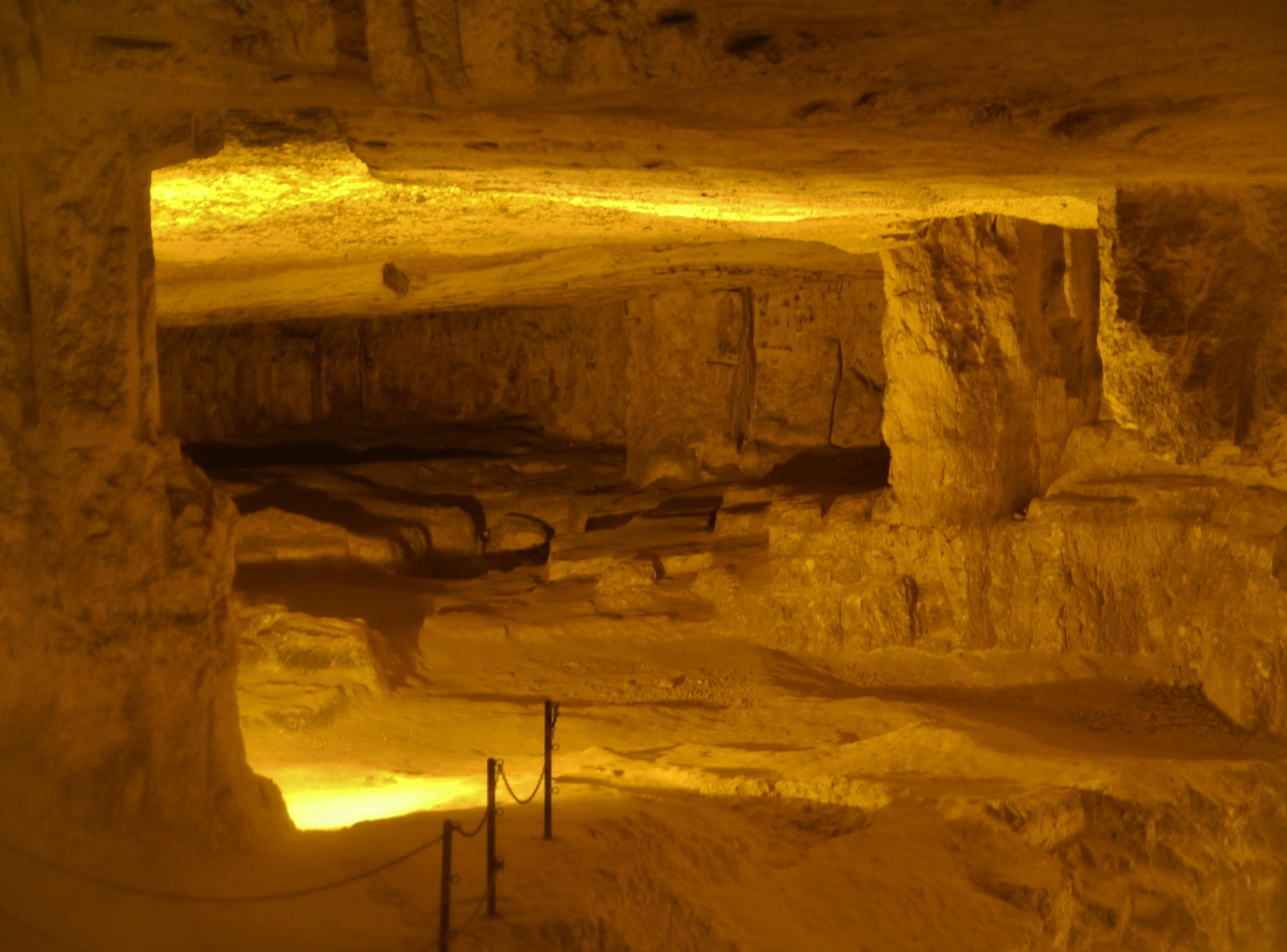
Zedekiah's Cave

== Museums ==
- Israel Museum – the national museum of Israel
  - Shrine of the Book
- Bible Lands Museum Jerusalem
- Bloomfield Science Museum
- Herzl Museum
- Jerusalem Tax Museum
- L.A. Mayer Institute for Islamic Art
- Museum on the Seam
- Museum of Italian Jewish Art
- Natural History Museum
- Rockefeller Museum of Archeology; now administered as part of the Israel Museum
- Siebenberg House – private archaeology museum in the Old City
- Ticho House; now administered as part of the Israel Museum
- Tower of David Museum of the History of Jerusalem
- Yad Vashem Holocaust Museum
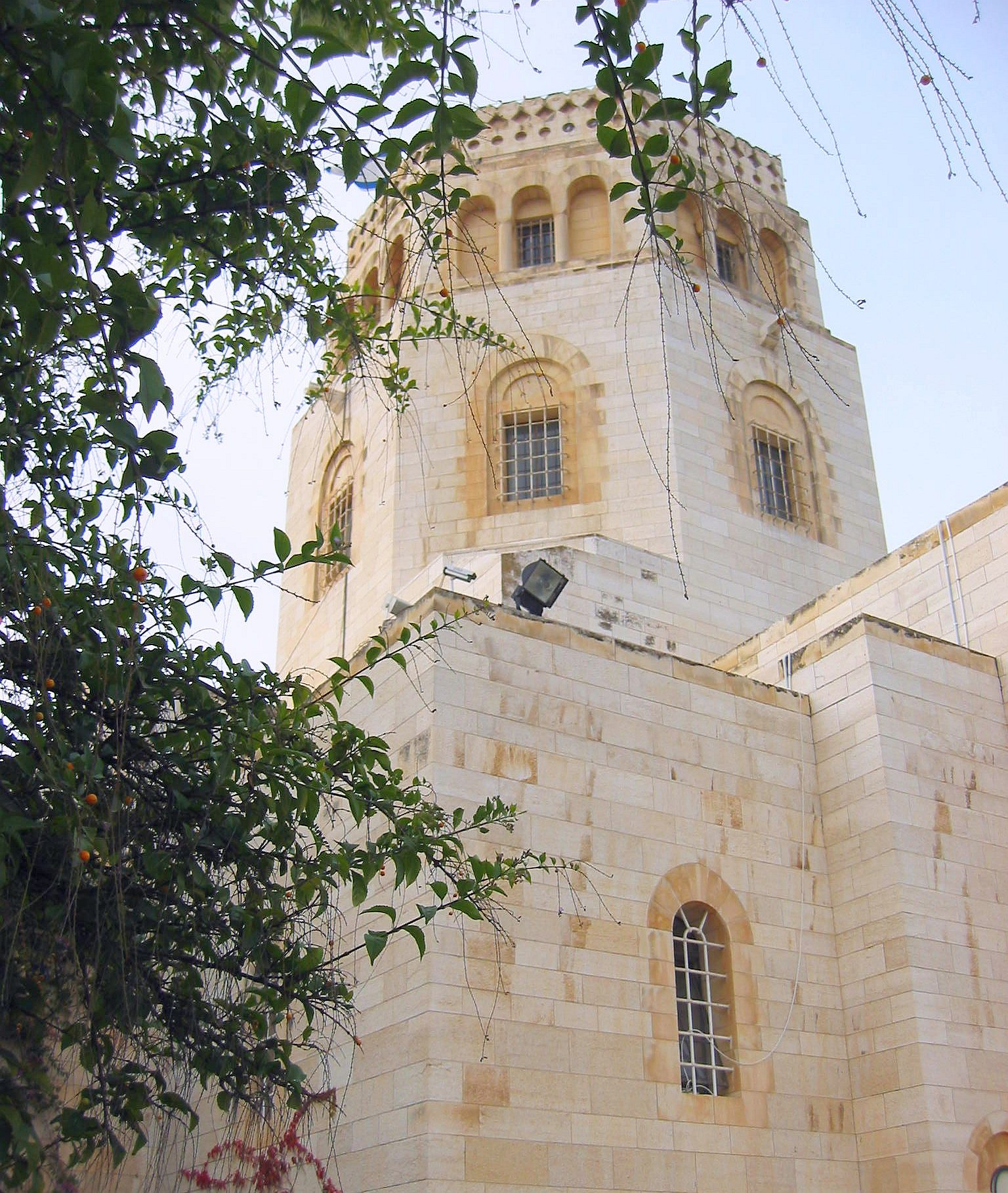
Rockefeller Museum

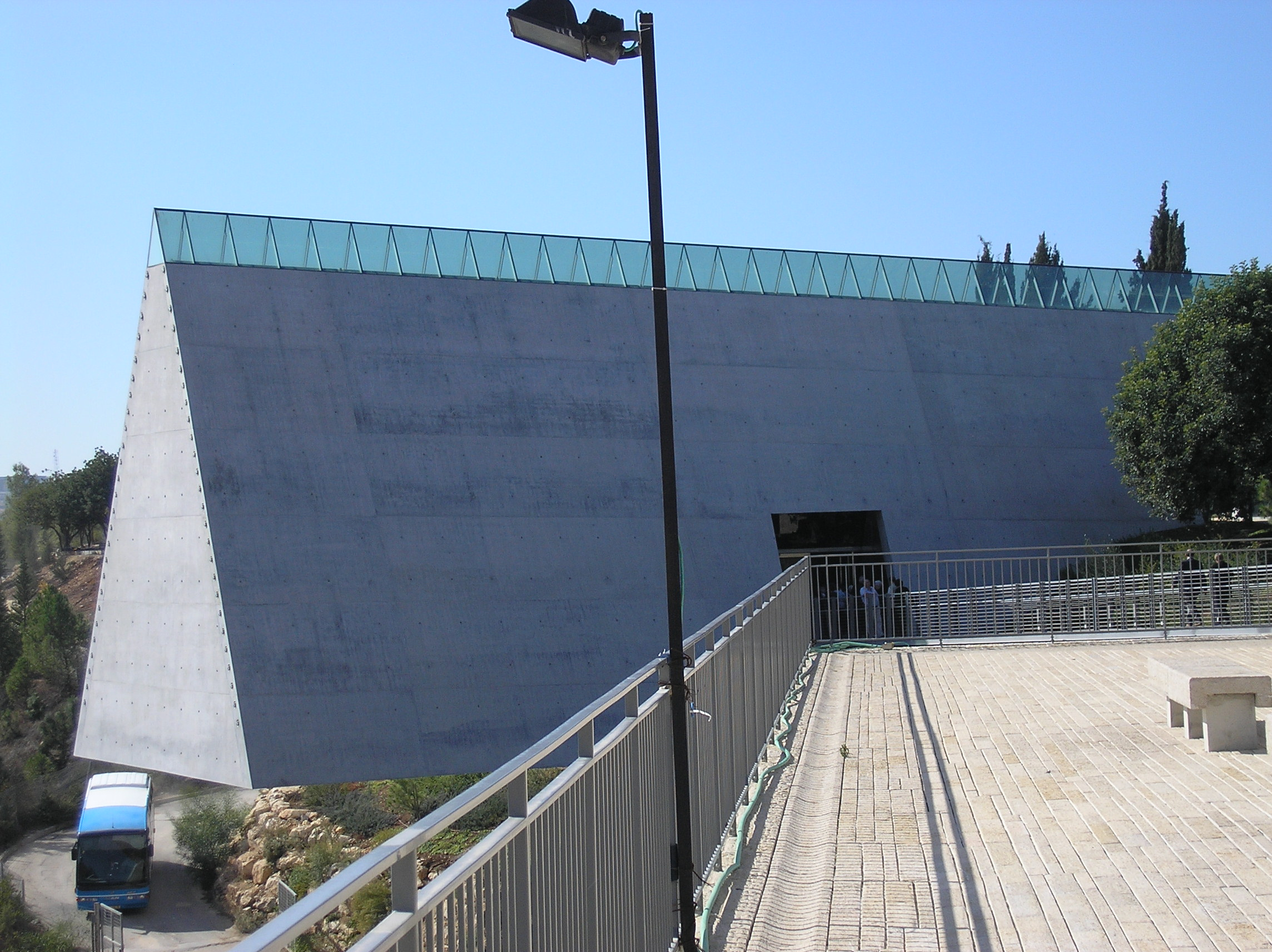
Yad Vashem

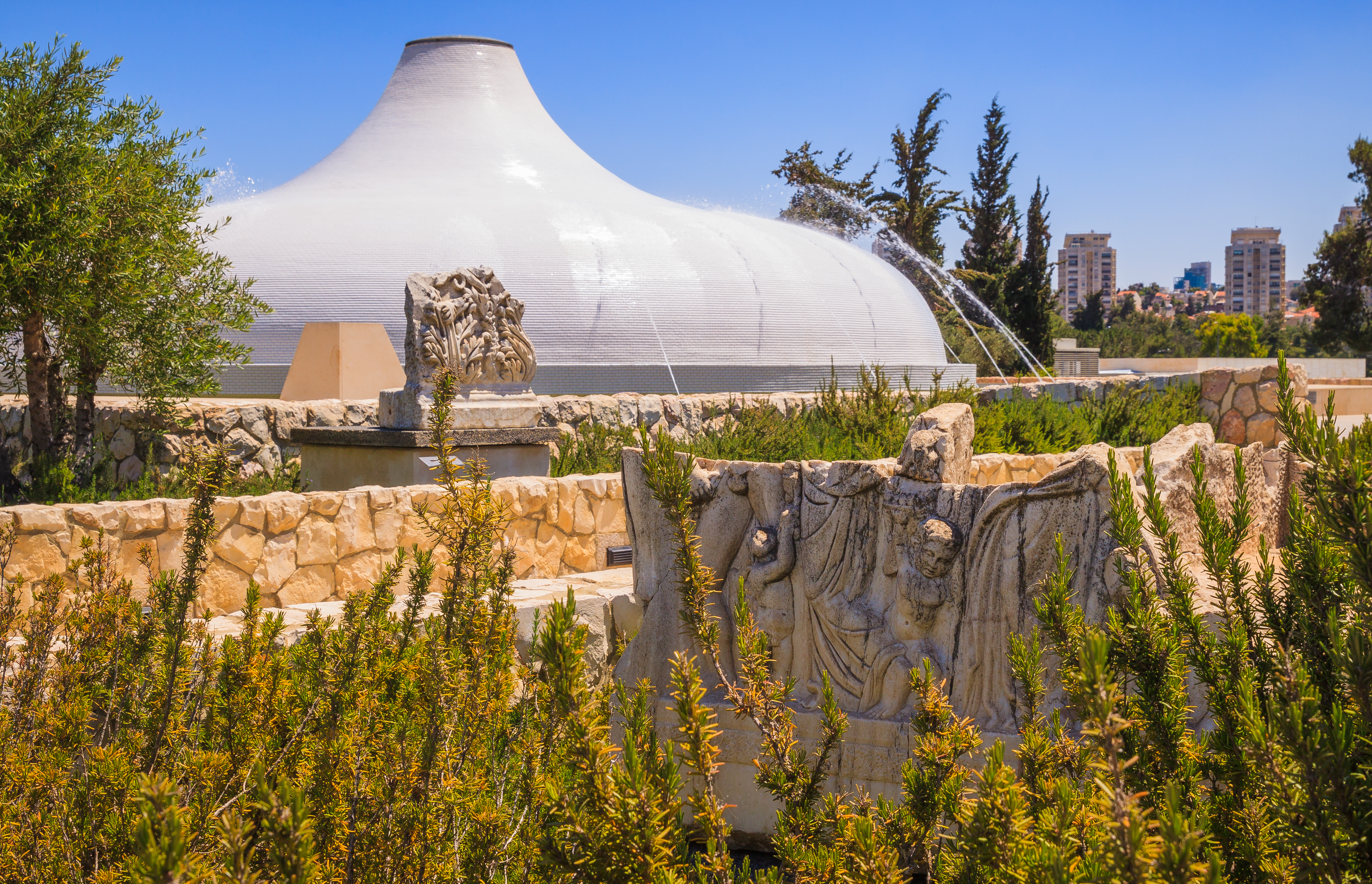
Shrine of the Book

== Hospitals ==
- ALYN Hospital Pediatric and Adolescent Rehabilitation Center
- Augusta Victoria Hospital
- Bikur Cholim Hospital
- Hadassah Medical Center (Hadassah hospital), Mount Scopus
- Hadassah Medical Center (Hadassah hospital), Ein Kerem
- Herzog Hospital (Ezrat Nashim)
- Kfar Shaul Mental Health Center
- Misgav Ladach (now a Kupat Holim diagnostic center)
- Makassed Hospital (al-Maqasid; al-Quds University Hospital)
- Shaare Zedek Medical Center
- St. John Ophthalmic Hospital
- St. Joseph Hospital
- French Hospice
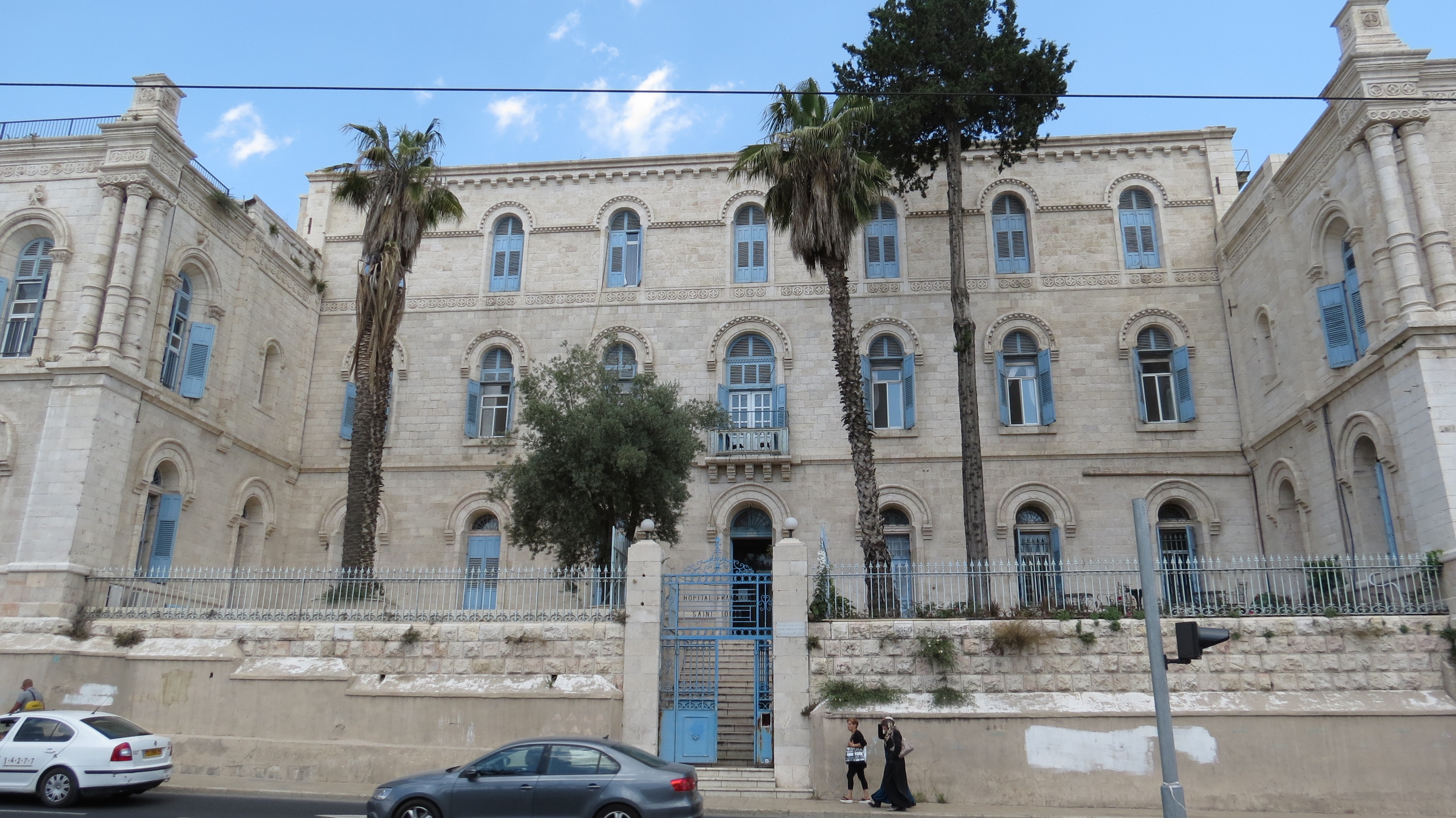
Saint Louis Hospital, Jerusalem

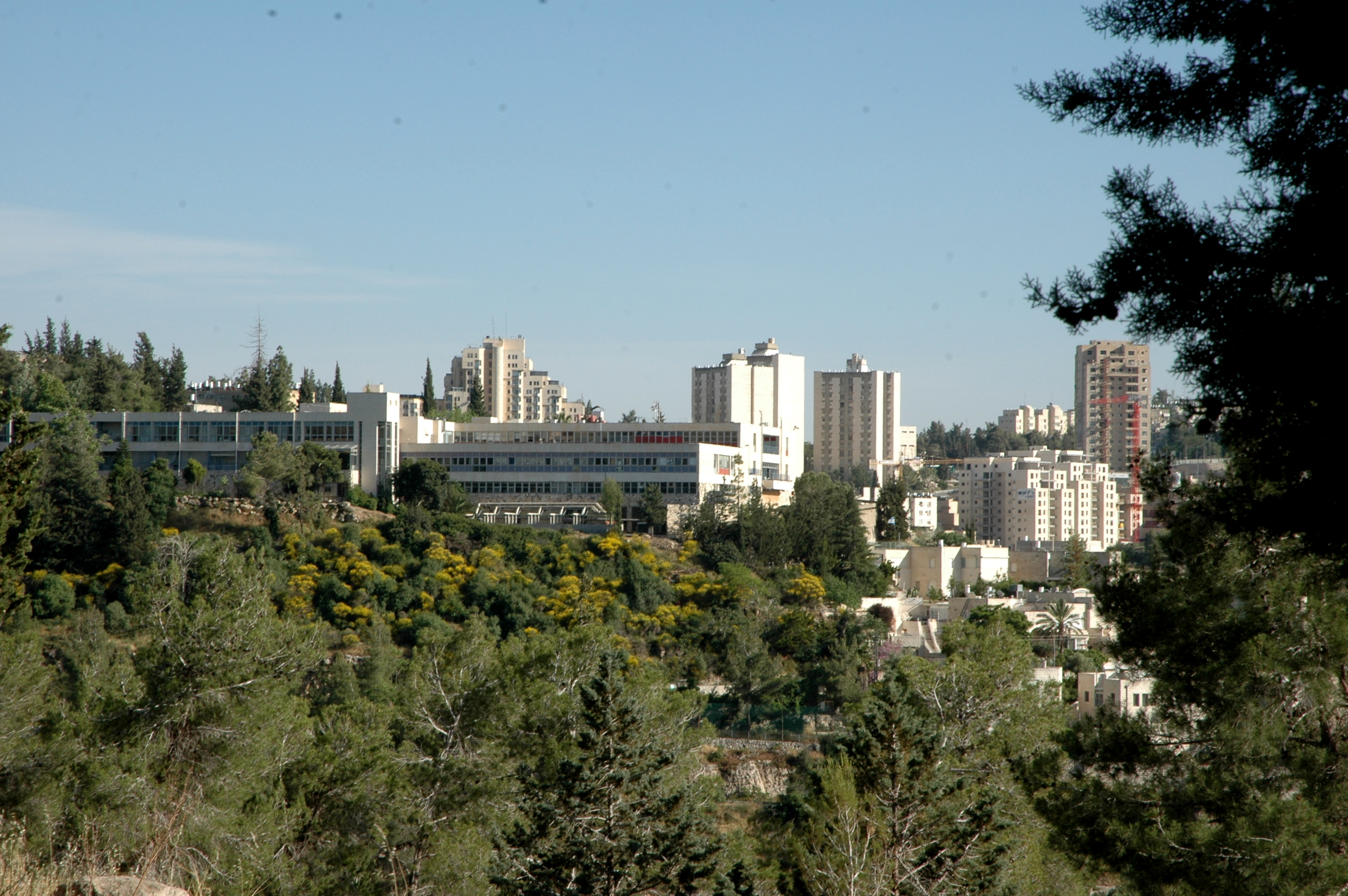
ALYN Hospital

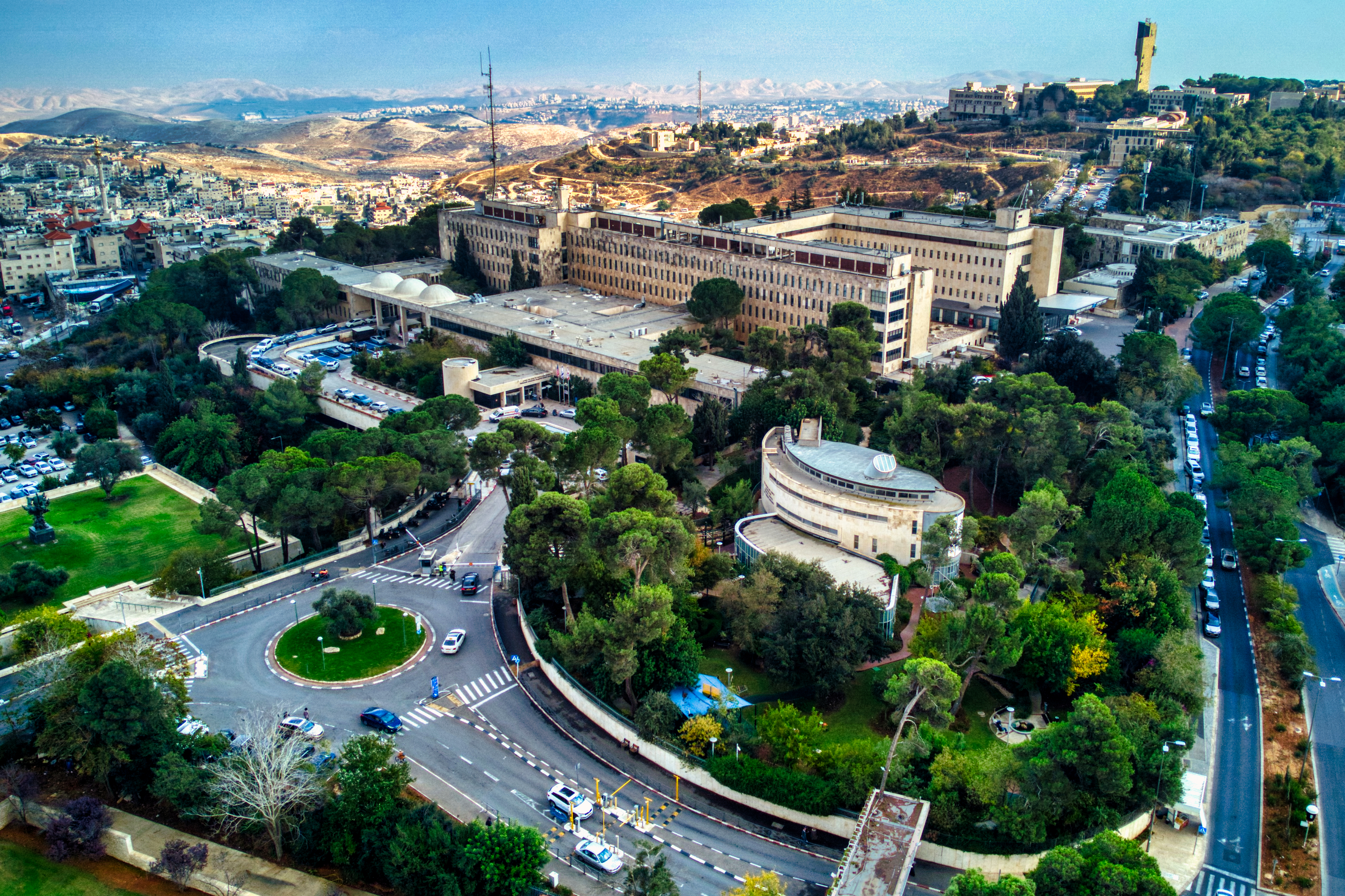
Hadassah Medical Center (Hadassah hospital), Mount Scopus

== Hotels ==
- Agripas Boutique Hotel
- American Colony Hotel
- Mount of Olives Hotel
- King David Hotel
- David Citadel Hotel
- Jerusalem Gate Hotel
- Jerusalem Plaza Hotel
- Inbal Hotel
- Jerusalem Pearl Hotel
- Three Arches Hotel
- Mount Zion Hotel
- Ramada Renaissance Hotel
- Little House in Bakah
- Scottish Guesthouse
- Prima Royale hotel
- Prima Kings hotel
- Dan Panorama Hotel
- Ramat Rachel Hotel
- Seven Arches Hotel
- The Olive Tree Hotel
- Lev Yerushalayim Hotel
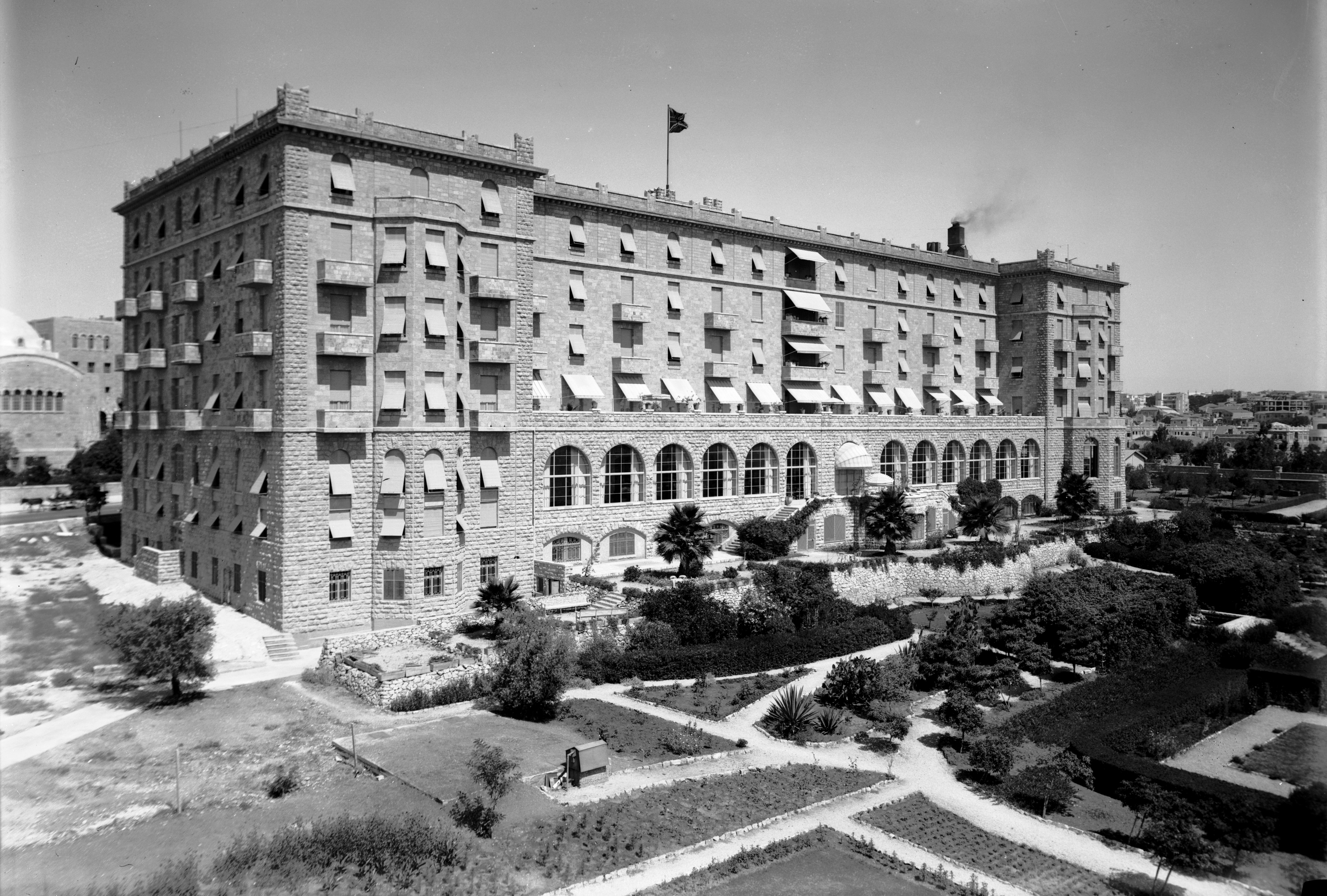
King David Hotel

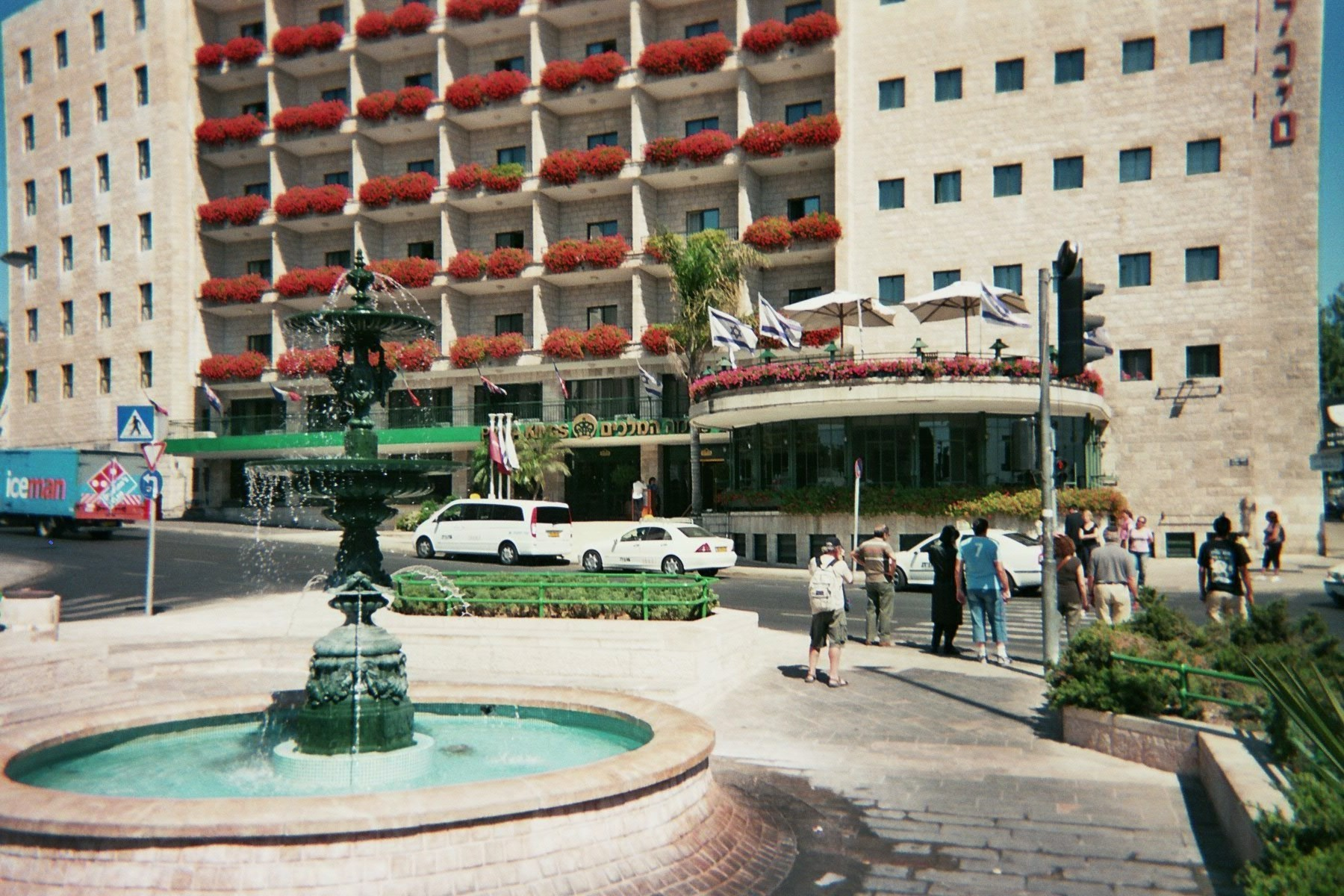
Prima Kings hotel

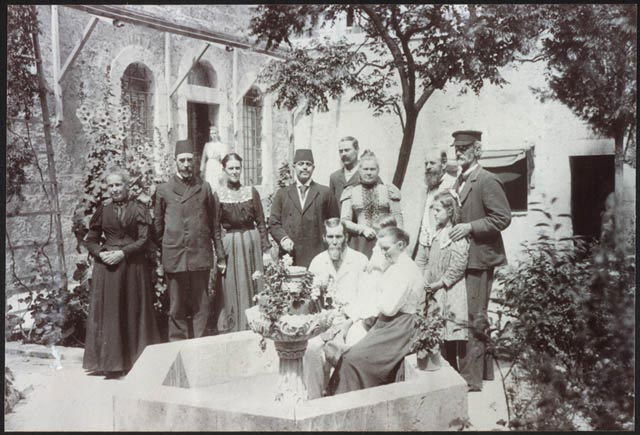
American Colony, Jerusalem

== Government institutions ==
- Bank of Israel
- Knesset – the Israeli parliament
- Supreme Court of Israel
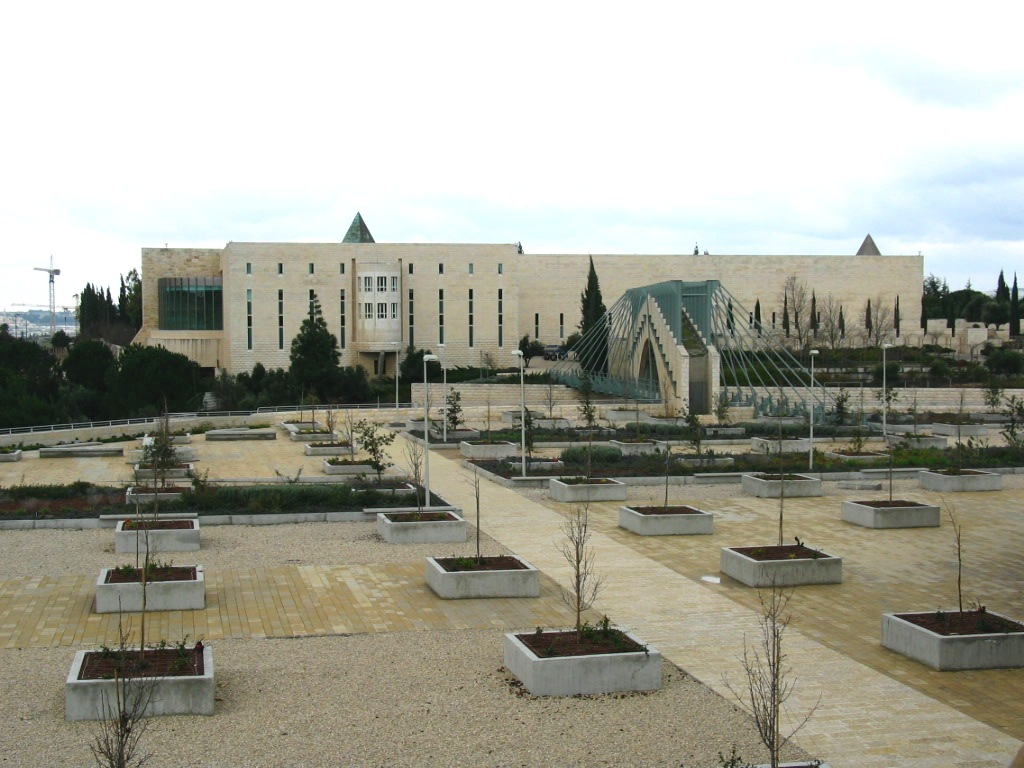
Supreme Court of Israel

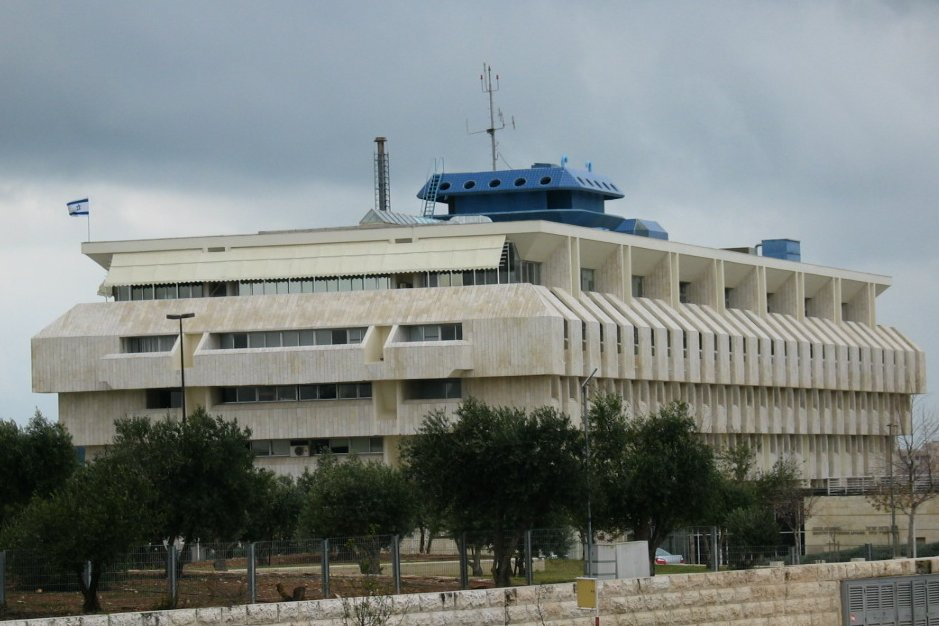
Bank of Israel

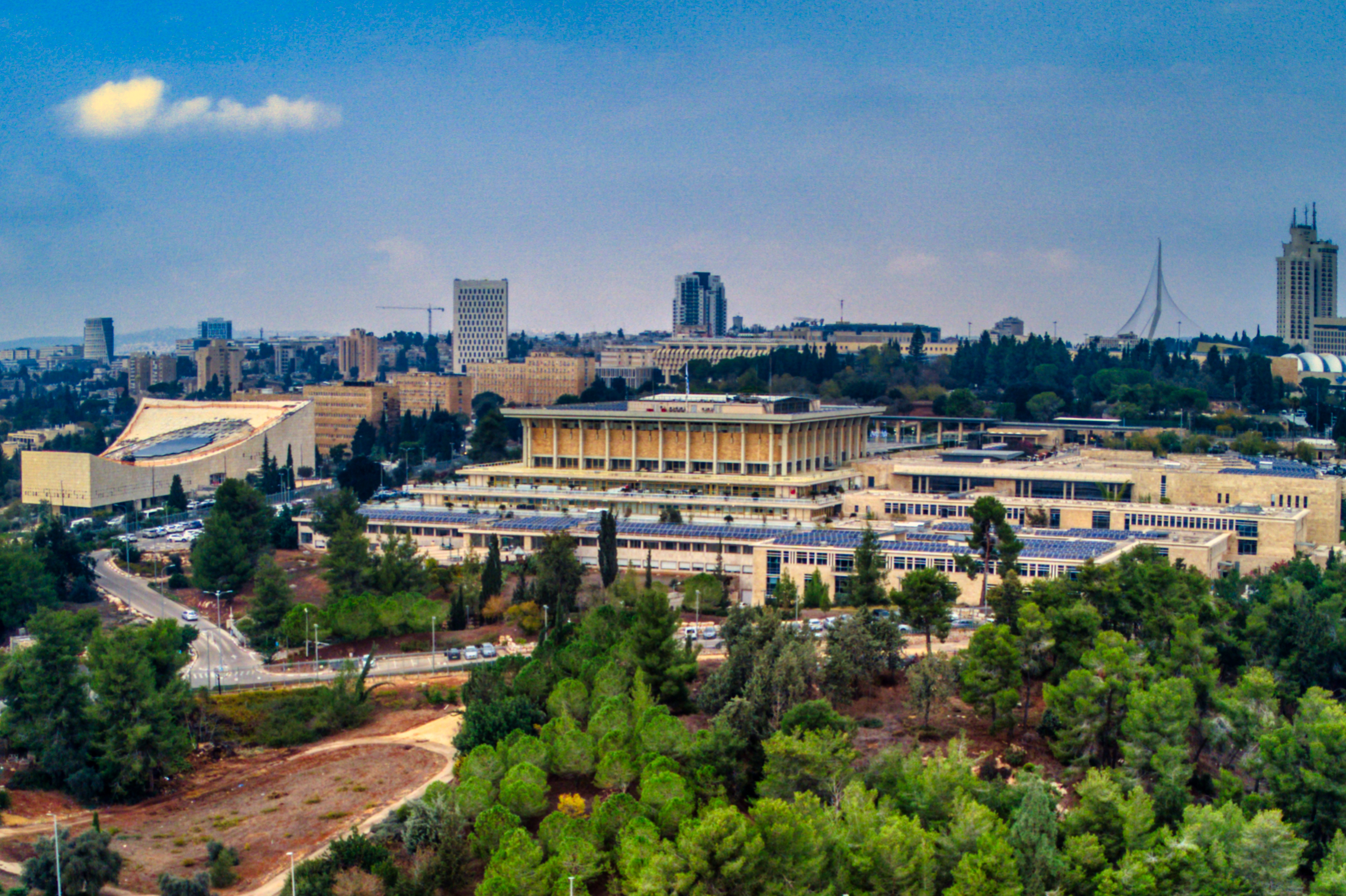
Knesset

== Educational institutions ==
=== Universities and colleges ===
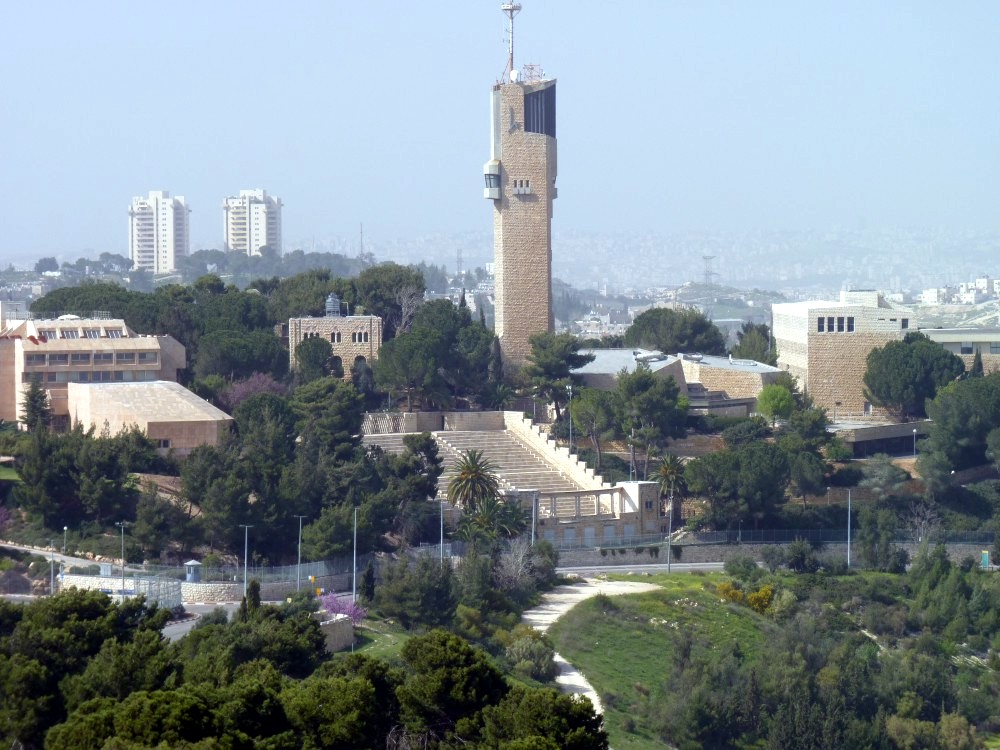
Hebrew University Jerusalem IL WV

- Al-Quds University
- Bezalel Academy of Art and Design
- Brigham Young University Jerusalem Center - University owned by the Church of Jesus Christ of Latter-day Saints
- Hebrew University of Jerusalem
- Jerusalem College of Engineering
- Jerusalem College of Technology
- L'Ecole Biblique et Archeologique Francaise
- David Yellin Teachers' College
- Emuna College
- Hadassah School of Medicine
- Hadassah College
- Hebrew Union College

=== Yeshivas ===
- Ateret Cohanim
- Beit El Synagogue, for Sephardi students of Kabbalah
- Brisk yeshivas
- Conservative Yeshiva
- Kol Torah Yeshiva
- Lakewood East (Israeli branch of Lakewood yeshiva)
- Mercaz HaRav
- Mirrer Yeshiva
- Porat Yosef Yeshiva
- Pressburg Yeshiva
- Sfas Emes Yeshiva
- Shaar Hashamayim Yeshiva, for Ashkenazi students of Kabbalah
- Torah Ore
- Toldot Yeshurun-Yeshiva for Russian Speakers
- Yeshivat Eretz HaTzvi
- Yeshivat HaKotel

== Religious sites ==
=== In ruins ===
- Church of St. Mary of the Germans
- Nea Ekklesia of the Theotokos

=== Multiple religions ===
- Chapel of the Ascension – part of a mosque, but venerated by most Christian denominations
- Mount Zion
  - Cenacle – now state property, not part of any church
- Temple Mount / Al-Aqsa Compound
  - Well of Souls or Holy of Holies, the cave under the Dome of the Rock

=== Christian ===
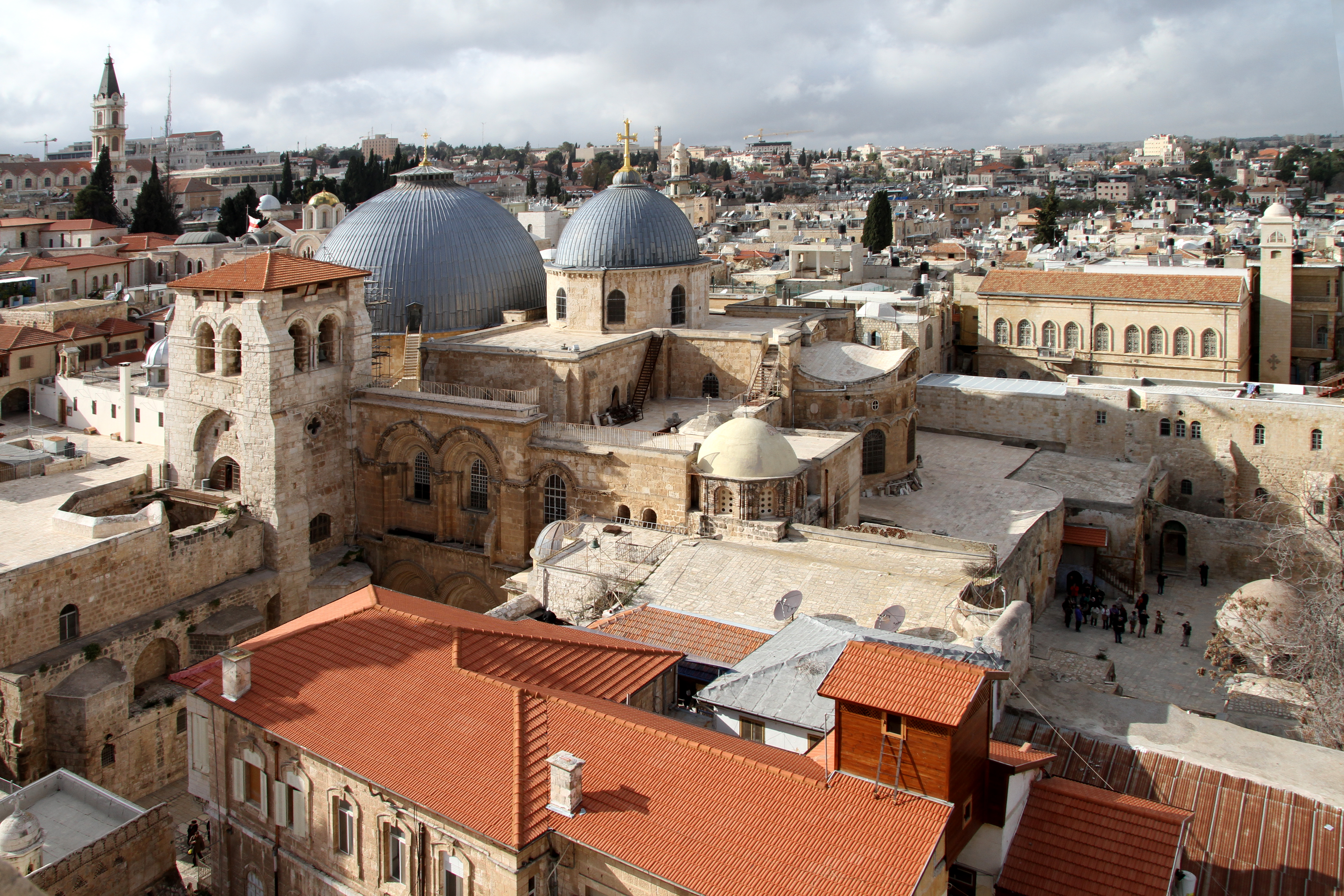
Church of the Holy Sepulchre in the Christian Quarter: Jerusalem is generally considered the cradle of Christianity.

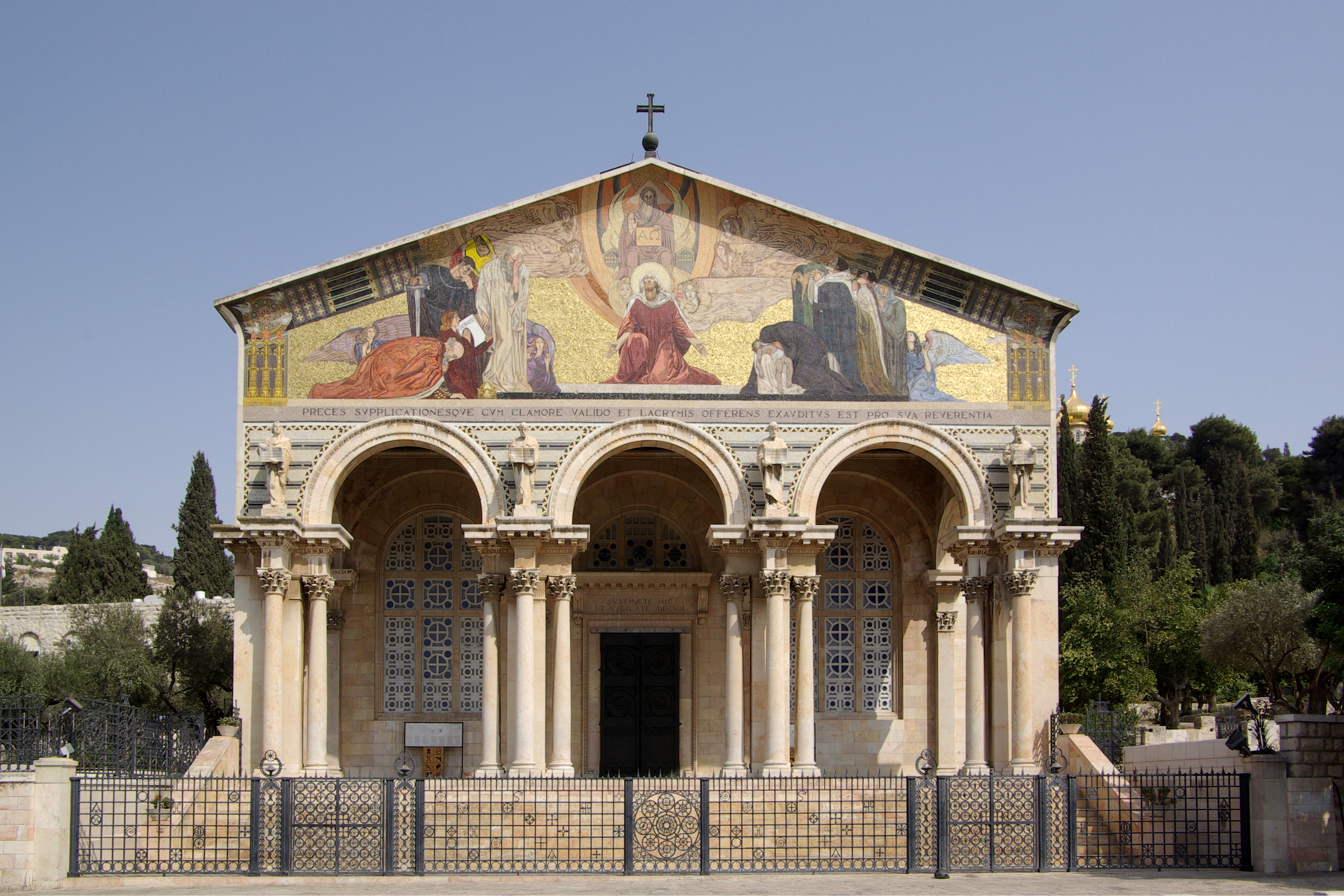
Church of All Nations near Mount of Olives in Jerusalem

==== Multiple denominational ====
- Church of the Holy Sepulchre
- Tomb of the Virgin Mary

==== Catholic (Roman and Eastern) ====
- Annunciation Cathedral – Melkite Greek Catholic
- Church of All Nations or of Agony, Gethsemane
- Church of Bethphage
- Church of Our Lady of the Spasm – Armenian Catholic
- Church of St. John the Baptist (Ein Karem, Jerusalem)
- Church of St. Peter in Gallicantu
- Church of the Condemnation and Imposition of the Cross
- Church of the Flagellation
- Church of the Pater Noster
- Church of the Visitation (Ein Karem, Jerusalem)
- Co-Cathedral of the Most Holy Name of Jesus
- Convent of the Sisters of Zion
- Dominus Flevit Church
- Dormition Abbey
- Ecce Homo (church), part of the Convent of the Sisters of Zion
- Garden of Gethsemane
- Grotto of Gethsemane
- St Anne's Church
- St. Stephen's Basilica (Saint-Étienne)
- St. Thomas Church or Cathedral – Syriac Catholic
- St. Vincent de Paul Chapel, Jerusalem
- Via Dolorosa

==== Eastern Orthodox ====
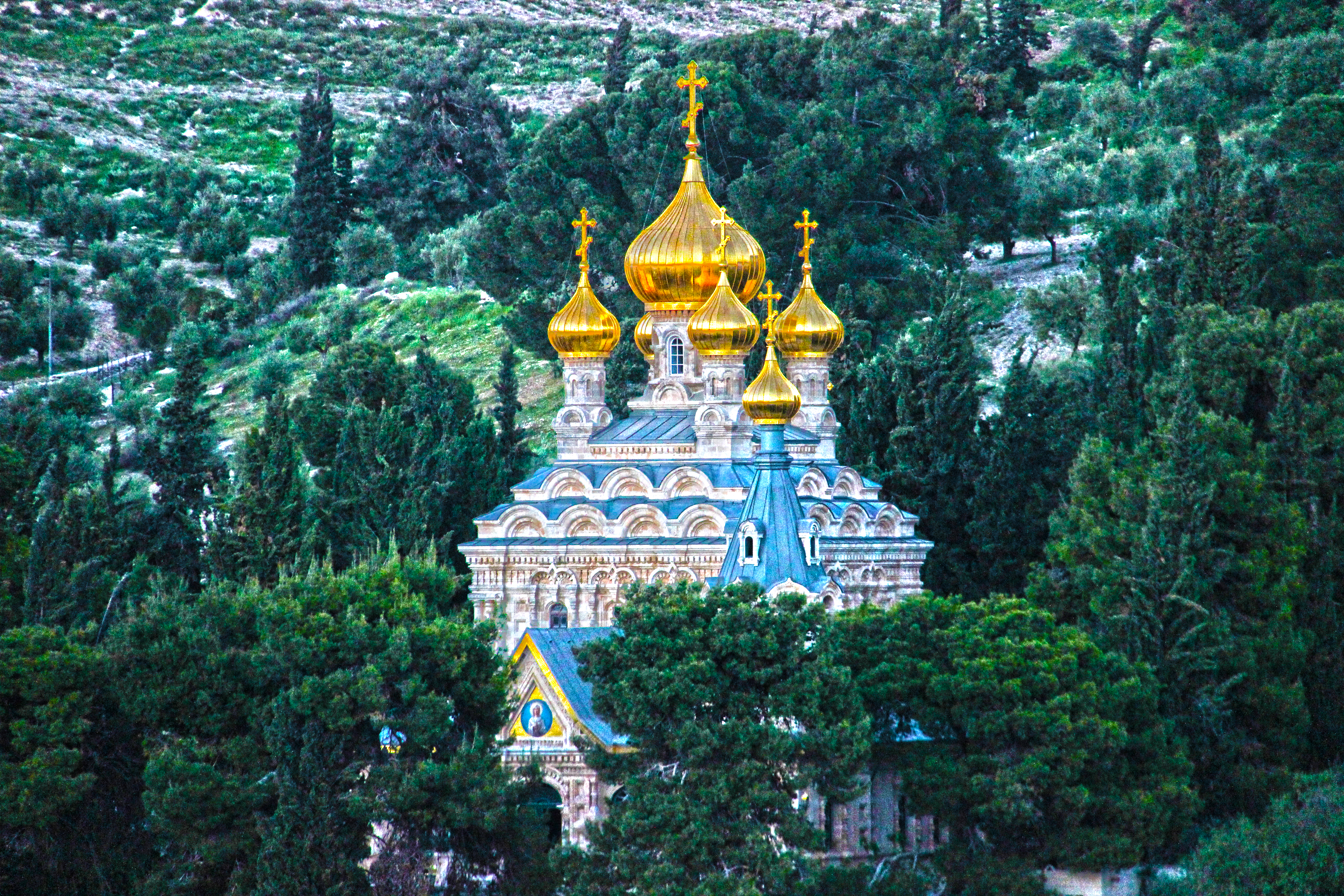
Church of Maria Magdalene

- Church of Maria Magdalene – Russian Orthodox
- Church of St Alexander Nevsky – Russian Orthodox
- Holy Trinity Cathedral in the Russian Compound – Russian Orthodox
- Monastery of the Cross – Greek Orthodox
- Romanian Orthodox Church, part of the Romanian Patriarchy's Representation to the Holy Places
- Convent of the Ascension on the Mount of Olives, with the Church of the Ascension and the Church of the Finding of the Head of St John the Baptist – Russian Orthodox
- St John the Baptist Church – Greek Orthodox
- St. Symeon of Katamonas, church and convent – Greek Orthodox

==== Oriental Orthodox ====
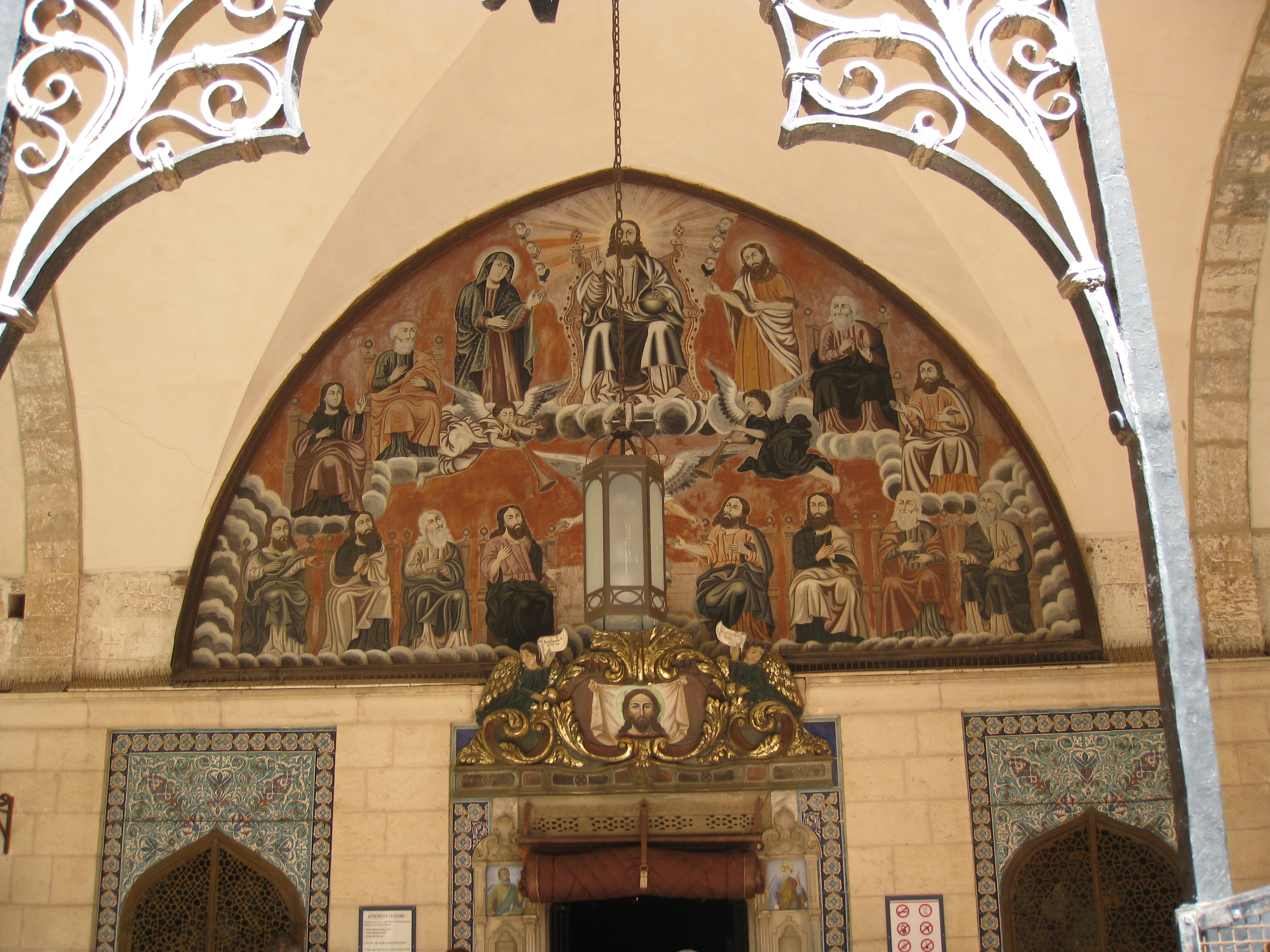
Cathedral of Saint James, Jerusalem

- Cathedral of St. James – Armenian Apostolic
- Church of the Holy Archangels – Armenian Apostolic
- Ethiopian Church – Ethiopian Orthodox
- "Deir es-Sultan" Coptic Monastery – Coptic Orthodox, contested by the Ethiopians
- Saint Mark Monastery Of Jerusalem – Syriac Orthodox
- St. Toros Church – Armenian Apostolic

==== Protestant ====
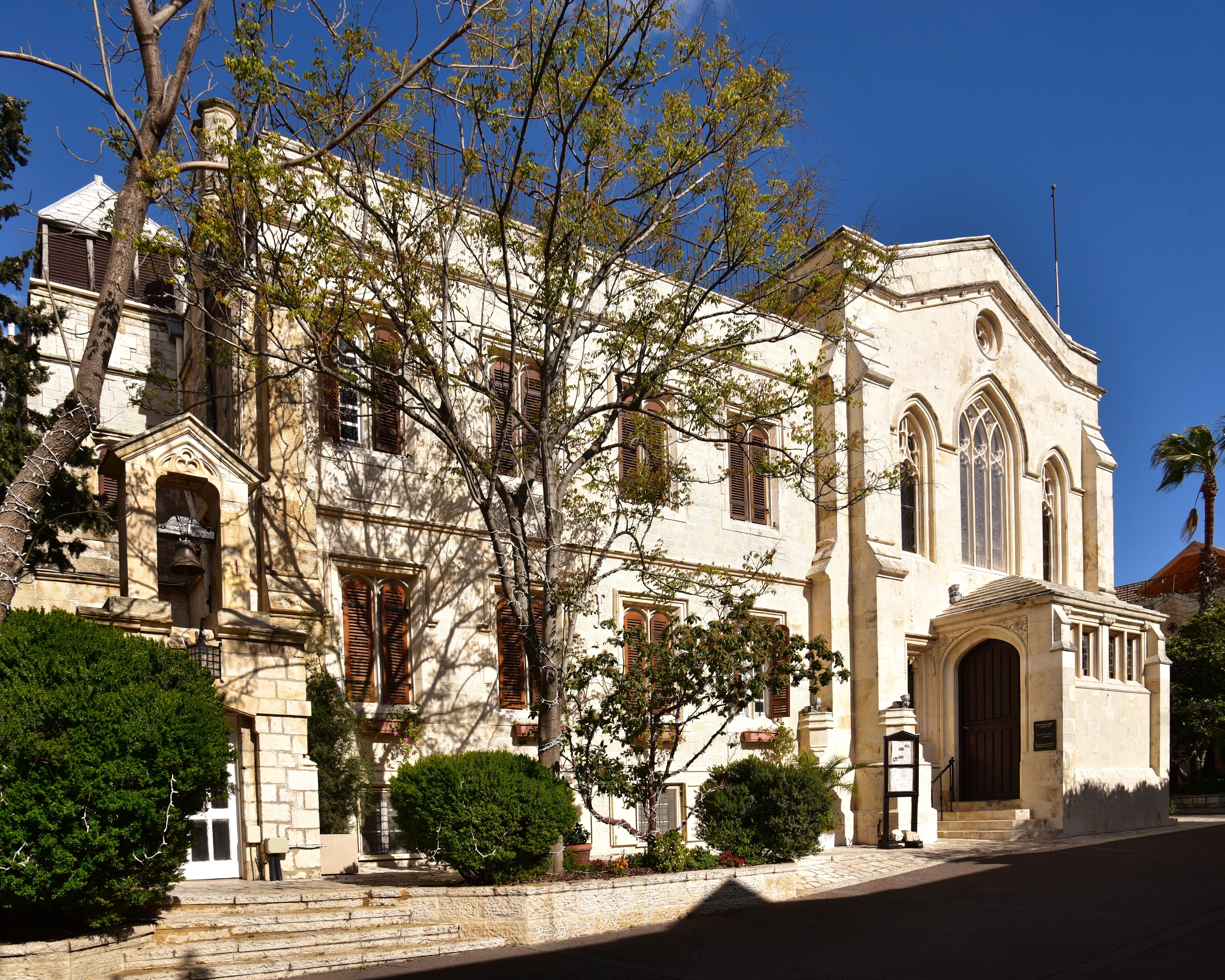
Christ Church, Jerusalem

- Christ Church
- Ascension Church at the German Augusta Victoria Foundation – Evangelical Church in Germany
- Lutheran Church of the Redeemer – Evangelical Church in Germany
- St. George's Cathedral – Anglican
- St Andrew's, aka the Scottish Church – Church of Scotland.
- The Garden Tomb – non-denominational, but popular with Evangelicals, Anglicans and other Protestants

==== Pilgrim hostels ====
- Austrian Hospice on Via Dolorosa
- Polish House "Dom Polski", nunneries with pilgrim hostels run by Polish Sisters of Saint Elizabeth (Old and New, Polish articles), Old City and Homa haShlishit ('Third Wall') Street
- Romanian Orthodox Mission to the Holy Land, Homa haShlishit ('Third Wall') Street
- Russian Compound: several former pilgrim hostels

=== Islamic ===
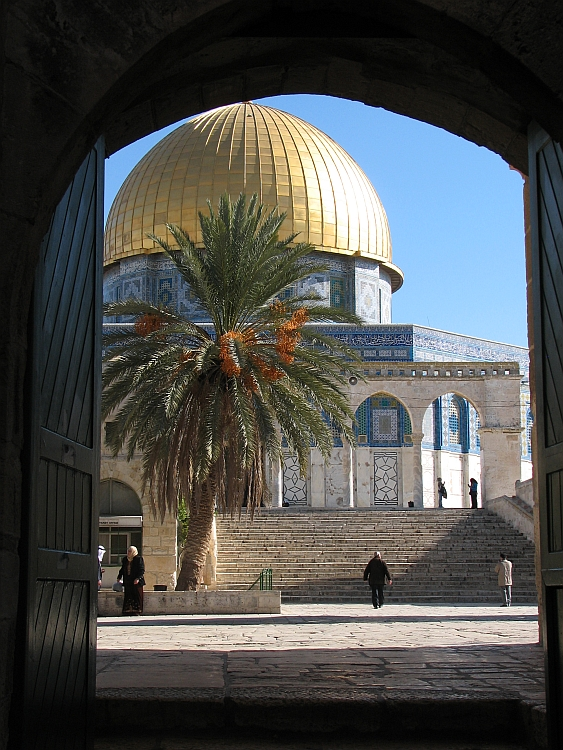
The Dome of the Rock, seen through the Cotton Merchants' Gate (Bab al-Qattanin)

- Haram ash-Sharif (Temple Mount)
  - Jami al-Aqsa
  - Dome of the Rock
    - Well of Souls or Holy of Holies, the cave under the Dome of the Rock
  - Dome of the Chain
  - Fountain of Qayt Bay
  - Madrasa al-Ashrafiyya
- Al-Khanqah al-Salahiyya Mosque
- Al-Yaqubi Mosque – the Crusader Church of St. James Intercisus, transformed after 1187 into a mosque
- Mosque of Omar, next to the Church of the Holy Sepulchre

== Cemeteries ==
=== Multi-religious ===
- Indian War Cemetery, Talpiot
- Jerusalem British War Cemetery
- Mount Herzl National Cemetery – civilian and military
- Tabachnik Garden on Mt Scopus: the main American Colony Cemetery (Protestant) and Bentwich Cemetery (Jewish)

=== Jewish ===
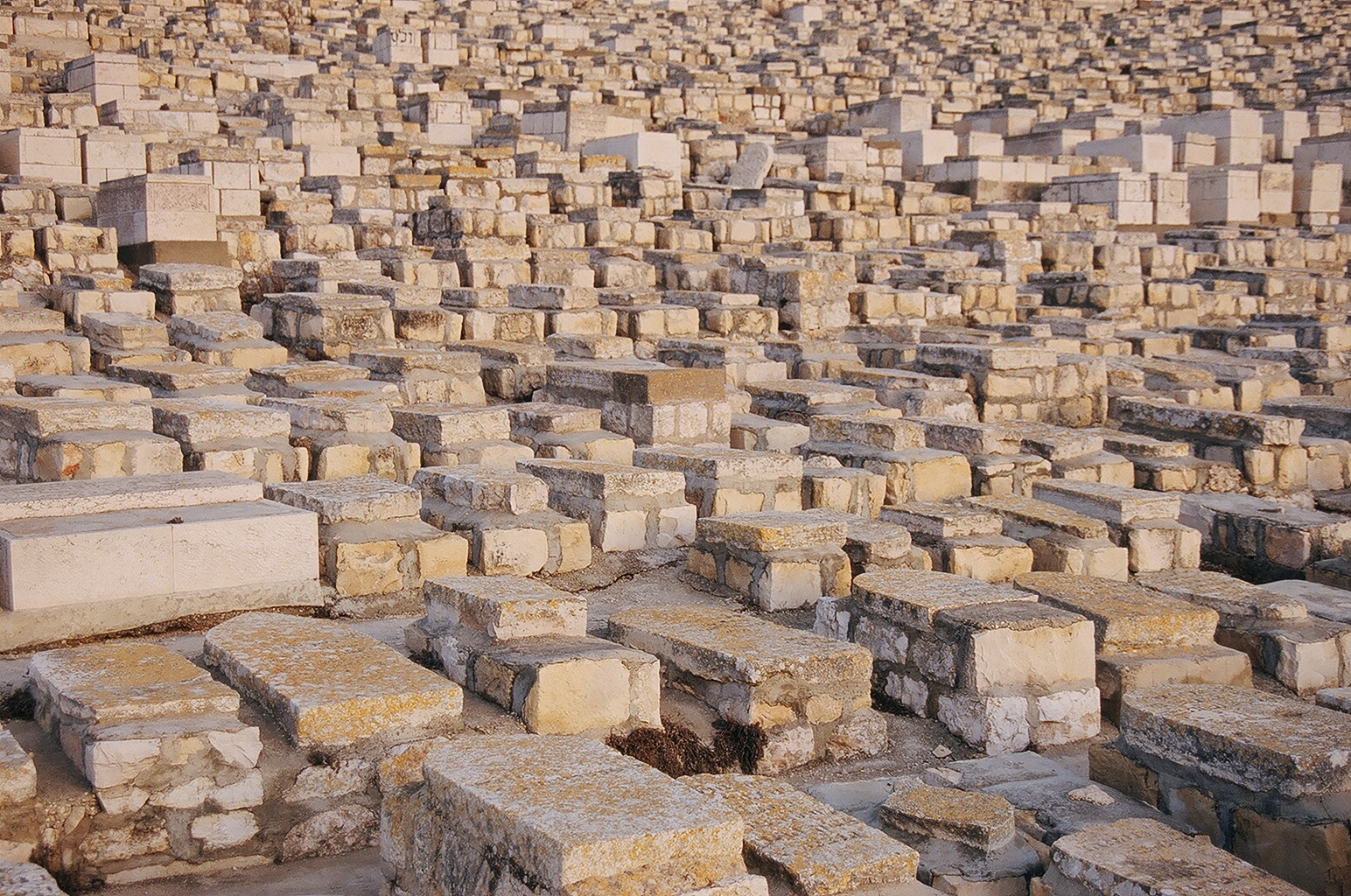
Mount of Olives Jewish cemetery

- Har HaMenuchot, Givat Shaul
- Mount of Olives Jewish cemetery
- Sanhedria Cemetery
- Sheikh Badr Jewish Cemetery

=== Christian ===
- Mount Zion cemeteries:
  - Protestant Mount Zion Cemetery
  - other cemeteries on Mount Zion: Armenian Apostolic, Greek Orthodox, Roman Catholic, Muslim
- Templer Cemetery, Emek Refaim

=== Muslim ===
- Bab Sitni Mariam Cemetery – Muslim cemetery next to Lions' Gate

== See also ==
- List of East Jerusalem locations
- List of Jerusalem embassies
- List of mosques in Jerusalem
- The Old City gates, an overview
