= Jerusalem Gate Hotel =

Hotel in Jerusalem

Coordinates: 31.78985°N 35.20097°E

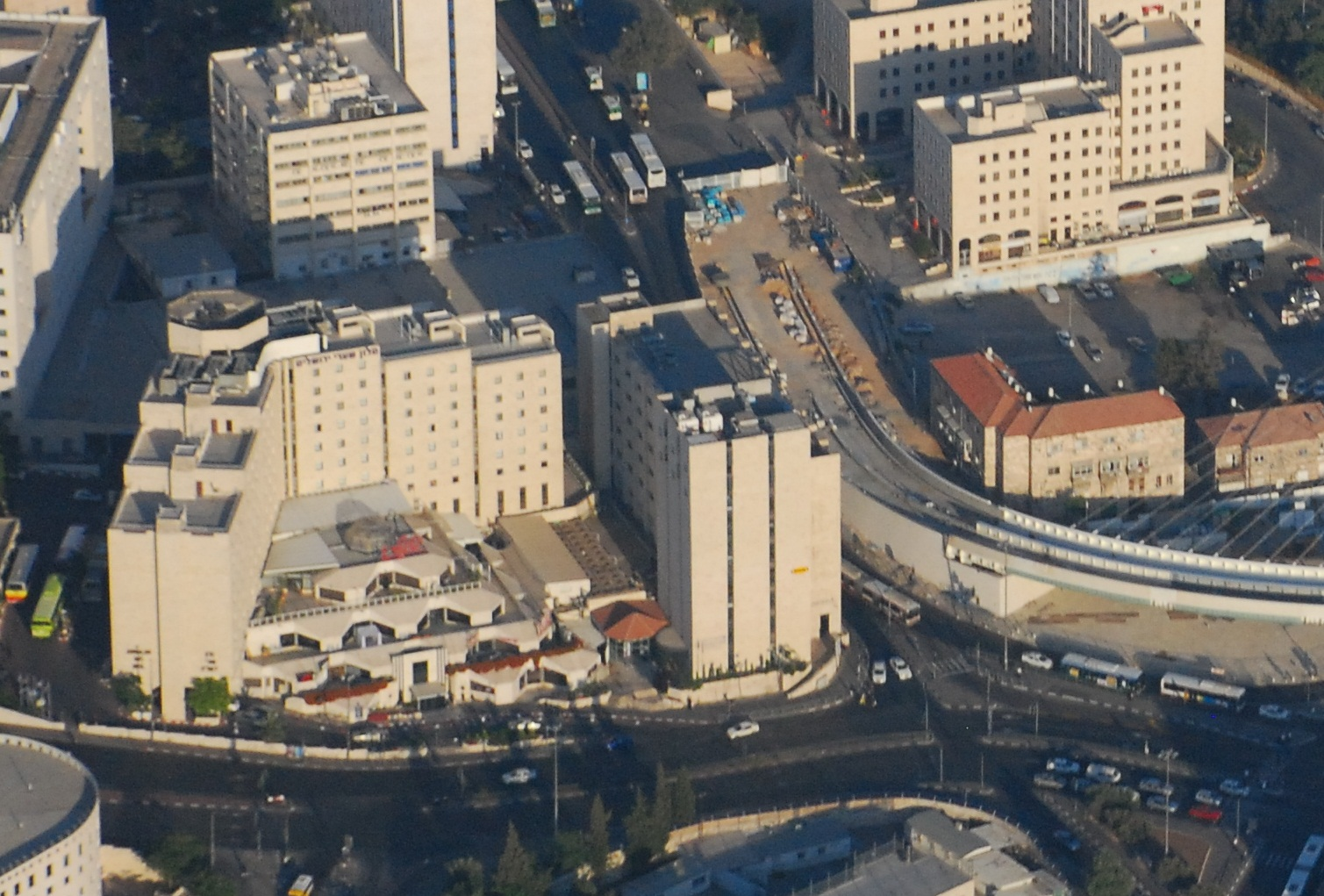
The Jerusalem Gate hotel is above and attached to Centre One

The Jerusalem Gate Hotel is a hotel located at the western entrance to Jerusalem, Israel. The hotel is attached to the shopping mall, Centre One.

The hotel was constructed in 1988 by Heftsiba. In April 2006, the hotel was bought by American investor Morris Wilner.

The hotel focuses on the Haredi, and Orthodox Jewish demographic. To this end the hotel has a mikvah on site.
