= Heftsiba =

Defunct Israeli construction company

- Native name: Heftsiba Construction, Development and Investments Ltd.
- Company type: Private
- Industry: Real estate, Construction
- Founded: 1968
- Founder: Mordechai Yona
- Fate: Collapsed (2007)
- Headquarters: Israel
- Key people: Boaz Yona (CEO)
- Products: Residential housing, commercial centres, hotels

Heftsiba (also rendered as Heftsiba Construction, Development and Investments Ltd.) was an Israeli real estate and construction conglomerate founded in 1968 by businessman Mordechai Yona. Over the course of nearly four decades, the company grew into one of Israel's most prominent construction firms, accumulating a portfolio encompassing thousands of apartments, commercial centres, and hotels both in Israel and abroad.

Its collapse in 2007, attributed to financial mismanagement, legal decisions regarding illegally constructed settlements in the West Bank, and the departure of its chief executive, left approximately 10,000 households without completed homes and significantly impacted the Israeli real estate sector.

== History ==
Heftsiba was established in 1968 by Mordechai Yona as a construction enterprise targeting the lower end of the Israeli residential market. The company expanded steadily over subsequent decades, developing housing projects in peripheral Israeli towns as well as, controversially, in the occupied territories of the West Bank.

By the mid-2000s, Heftsiba had accumulated a substantial portfolio of residential and commercial developments in Israel and in other countries, including a joint venture in Romania, where the firm partnered with the Apollo Real Estate investment group to acquire land in the town of Voluntari near Bucharest for approximately €13 million, with plans to construct around 1,000 apartments covering a total floor area of 100,000 square metres. Its subsidiary, Heftsiba Jerusalem Gold Ltd., also recorded profits from property transactions in northern Bucharest during this period.

Leadership passed to Mordechai Yona's son, Boaz Yona, who served as the company's chief executive officer and drove its aggressive expansion, including its significant involvement in building residential settlements in the West Bank.

=== West Bank construction and legal complications ===
A significant portion of Heftsiba's growth during the late 1990s and 2000s was driven by residential construction in the West Bank, particularly in the ultra-Orthodox Jewish settlement blocs of Modiin Illit and the nascent settlement of Matityahu East.

According to Peace Now secretary-general Yariv Oppenheimer, certain parcels of land were acquired through fraudulent means, involving Israeli activists who arranged for accomplices to impersonate Palestinian landowners using forged documents, thereby obtaining title to land that had in fact been passed down through Palestinian farming families for generations and was never voluntarily sold. The Israeli army, which held authority over the territories, and public authorities took no action to halt the construction, a fact that Peace Now characterised as scandalous.

In January 2006, the Israeli Supreme Court ruled in favour of Peace Now, ordering a halt to several of Heftsiba's West Bank construction sites. As a consequence, approximately 450 apartments under construction in Modiin Illit were abandoned mid-build, while a further 1,500 units intended to form the first neighbourhoods of Matityahu East were similarly left incomplete.

=== Financial collapse and the flight of Boaz Yona ===
Following the Supreme Court ruling, Boaz Yona attempted to find new investors to shore up the company's finances but was unsuccessful. Despite this, the company's sales teams continued to market apartments to buyers even as management was aware that the projects could not be completed, a practice that continued until the Israeli press exposed the situation on 3 August 2007. Shortly after the story broke publicly, Boaz Yona fled Israel.

The consequences of the collapse were significant. Approximately 10,000 families were left without the homes they had purchased, many of them having bought properties off-plan and invested substantial personal savings. Contemporary reports highlighted individual cases of buyers losing large sums on unfinished developments. In the settlement of Matityahu East, some families were reported to be living in incomplete structures lacking basic utilities, illustrating the broader social impact of the collapse. Many purchasers had relied on assurances from the company's sales representatives that all necessary approvals had been secured and were unaware of the company's financial difficulties prior to its failure.

Competitors quickly moved to acquire Heftsiba's abandoned projects, recognising the continued commercial demand in the ultra-Orthodox housing market.

=== Banking sector response and regulatory action ===
The collapse raised serious questions about the conduct of the banks that had financed Heftsiba's projects. In August 2007, the Supervisor of Banks, Rony Hizkiyahu, appeared before a joint session of the Knesset's Economic and Finance Committees to outline the Banking Supervision's approach to complaints from affected homebuyers. He identified six categories of cases in which banks had acted improperly and caused financial harm to buyers, including situations where banks had received funds designated for project accounts under the Sales (Housing) Law but had failed to issue the required guarantees, or had diverted payments into accounts other than the designated project accounts.

Following this parliamentary address, hundreds of buyers approached the Bank of Israel's Public Enquiries Unit with complaints. On 7 October 2007, a court ruled that the stay of proceedings against Heftsiba did not prevent banks from issuing guarantees to buyers, enabling the Supervisor of Banks to instruct financial institutions to provide remedies in accordance with the framework he had outlined, without requiring each affected buyer to pursue an individual legal action. Banks were separately accused in reporting by Haaretz of involvement in a cover-up of the affair.

=== Arrest, extradition, and criminal proceedings against Boaz Yona ===
Following his departure from Israel in August 2007, Boaz Yona was declared a fugitive by Israeli police, and an international arrest warrant was issued with the involvement of Interpol. He was subsequently apprehended by Italian authorities. An Italian court approved Israel's extradition request, though Yona initially challenged this ruling before the Italian Supreme Court. By May 2008, according to Israeli media, Yona had decided to drop his legal resistance to extradition, reportedly motivated by his prolonged separation from his family.

On 19 November 2008, the Jerusalem District Court sentenced Boaz Yona to seven years' imprisonment following his guilty plea to a range of charges, including conspiracy, fraud, grand larceny, forgery, executive theft, falsification of corporate records, use of forged documents, misappropriation of company funds, and fraudulent receipt of benefits.

Judge Moshe Ravid accepted the plea bargain negotiated between Yona and the State Prosecutor's Office regarding the custodial sentence, but doubled the financial penalty stipulated in the agreement, ordering restitution of NIS 8 million (approximately $2.03 million at the time) to victims of the collapse. In his ruling, the judge observed that without the plea arrangement, a lengthier sentence would have been warranted given the gravity of the offending, and criticised the prosecution for having insufficiently considered the interests of the victims when setting the original restitution figure.

Yona was released from prison early in 2012 as part of measures to address prison overcrowding, and the financial penalty originally imposed was subsequently reduced by half.

=== Later legal proceedings ===
In January 2022, Boaz Yona was arrested once more, this time on suspicion of defrauding creditors, money laundering, and related offences. Police alleged that he had accumulated debts totalling NIS 1.8 billion (approximately $583 million) and had sought to conceal assets and income streams by transferring them to third parties. He was arrested following an undercover investigation, during which police conducted raids on his residential and business premises.
