= Train Track Park =

Rail trail urban park in South Jerusalem

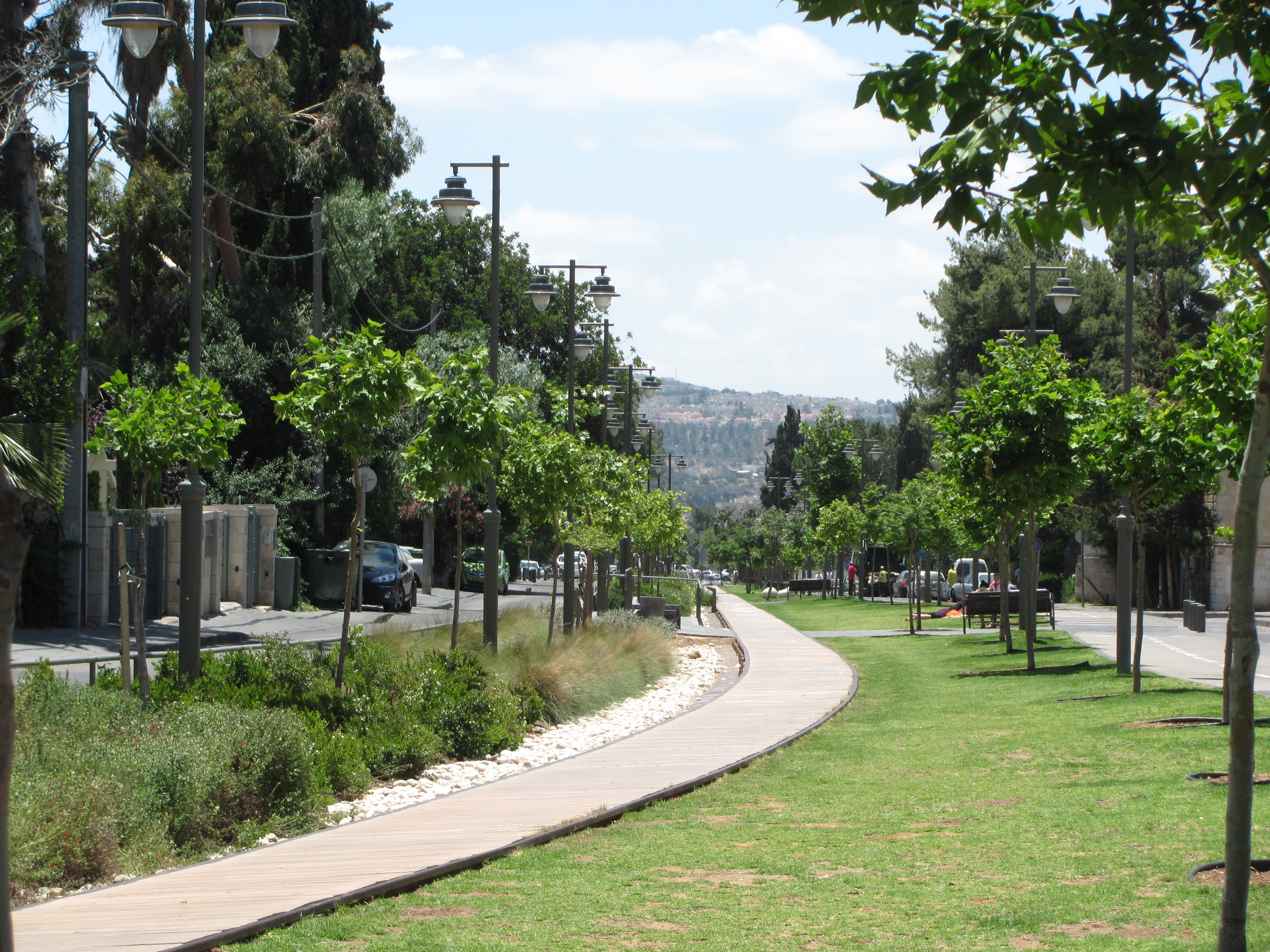
- Interactive map of Train Track Park
- Type: Urban park
- Location: West Jerusalem
- Coordinates: 31°45′28″N 35°12′48″E
- Area: 80 dunams (0.080 km^{2}; 0.031 sq mi)
- Created: 2010
- Designer: Yair Avigdor, Shlomi Ze'evi
- Status: Open all year

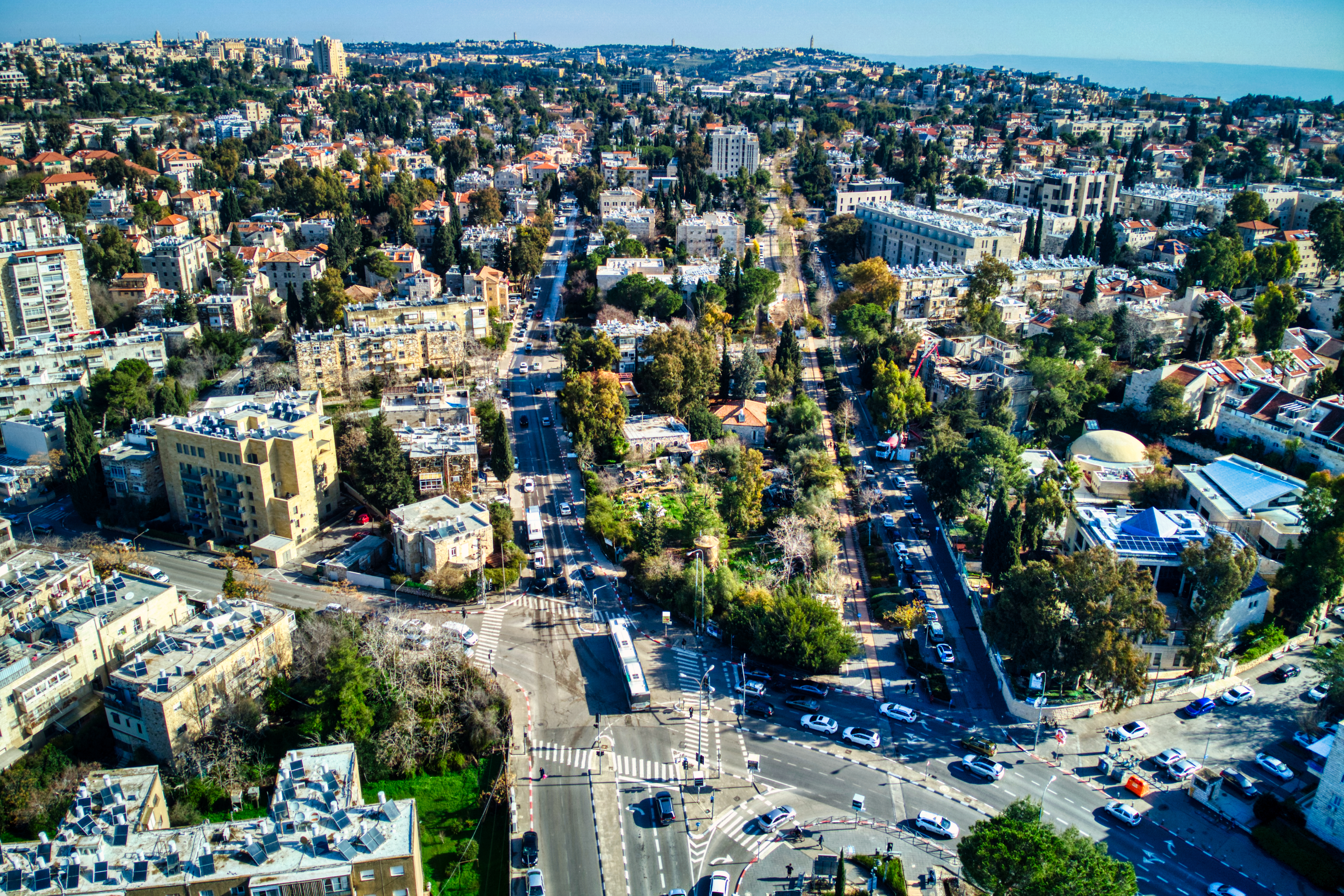
Emek Refaim street and Train Track Park parallel to each other

Train Track Park (Hebrew: פארק המסילה, Park HaMesila) is a rail trail urban park in West Jerusalem, Israel. Featuring 7 kilometres (4.3 mi) of walking and biking trails, the park follows the route of the original Jaffa–Jerusalem railway from the Jerusalem Railway Station near the German Colony to Teddy Stadium in Malha. The park is built over – and incorporates in its design – the original railway tracks installed in 1892 and used through 1998. The park has been noted as a symbol of coexistence in the divided city, as it passes through Jewish and Arab neighborhoods and is used by residents of both.

== Location ==
The Train Track Park starts just outside the former Jerusalem Railway Station and extends in a southwesterly direction 7 kilometres (4.3 mi) along the original route of the Jaffa–Jerusalem railway. It passes through seven neighborhoods – German Colony, Baka, Katamon, Pat, Mekor Chaim, and Beit Safafa, – ending outside Teddy Stadium in Malha.

== History ==
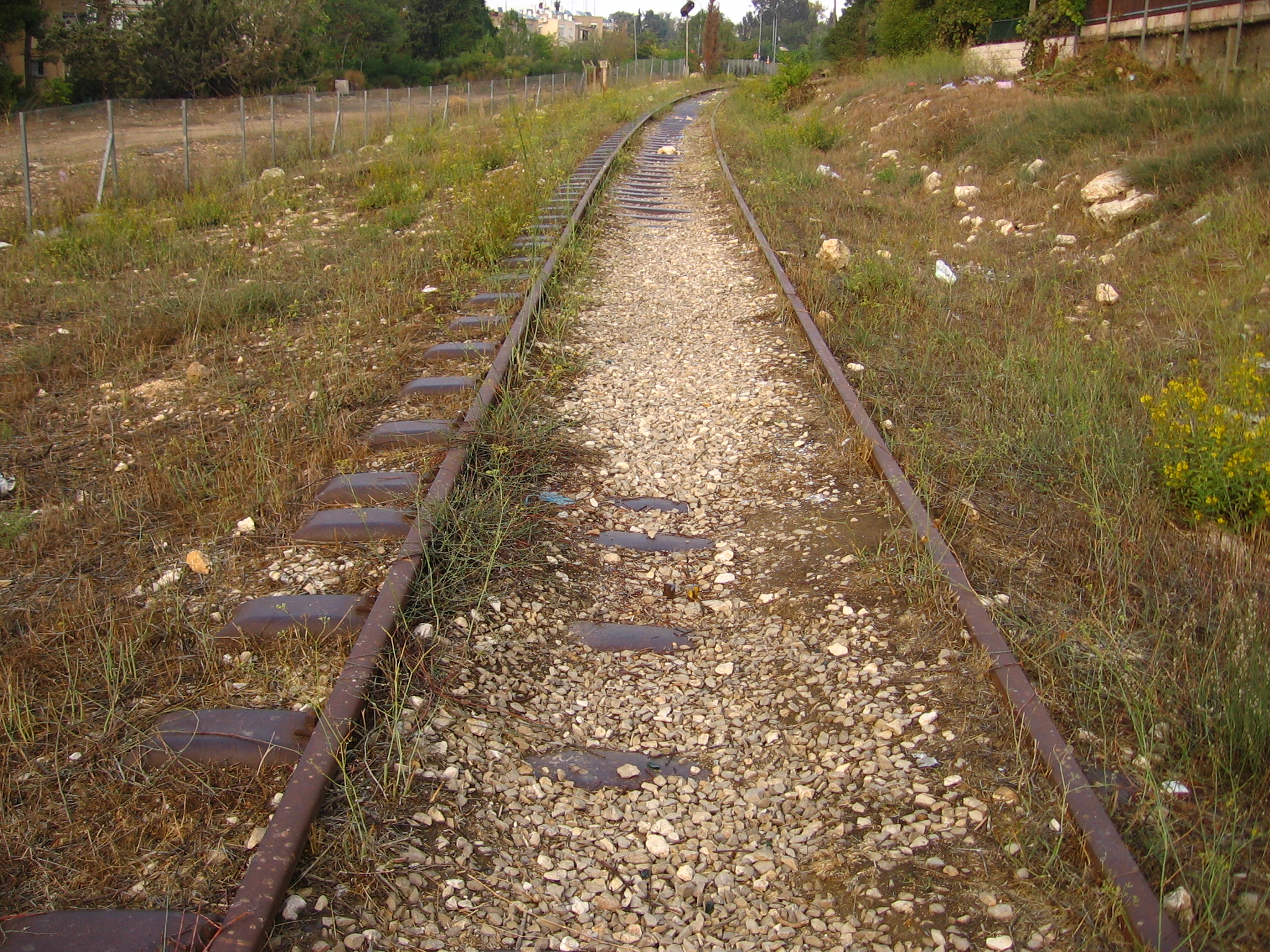
Abandoned tracks in Mekor Chaim, 2010

The Jaffa–Jerusalem railway was in operation from 1892 to 1998. With the closure of the railway for repairs, the Jerusalem Railway Station was shuttered in 1998. In April 2005 Israel Railways opened a new Jerusalem terminus at the Malha Station. The unused tracks between the Malha Station and the Jerusalem Railway Station became the site of neglect, litter, and off-road parking, and the Jerusalem municipality made plans to construct a roadway in their place.

In 2008, residents of the Katamonim neighborhoods and others abutting the tracks formed a Committee for the Train Track Park. They lobbied for the development of an urban park on the abandoned stretch of track instead of a road. They supported their protest with art events organized by the Bezalel Academy of Arts and Design and the planting of a community garden under the auspices of the Society for the Protection of Nature in Israel. Their initiative garnered support from Nir Barkat, who was elected Mayor of Jerusalem in 2008. Unlike his predecessor, Uri Lupolianski, who had supported road construction, Barkat and his deputy mayor, Naomi Tzur, supported the park initiative.

The NIS 40 million park project was spearheaded by the Jerusalem Development Authority, the Jerusalem Municipality, and Israel Railways. The park was designed by Yair Avigdor and Shlomi Ze'evi of Maanad Architects. It was constructed in stages between 2010 and 2013.

== Description ==
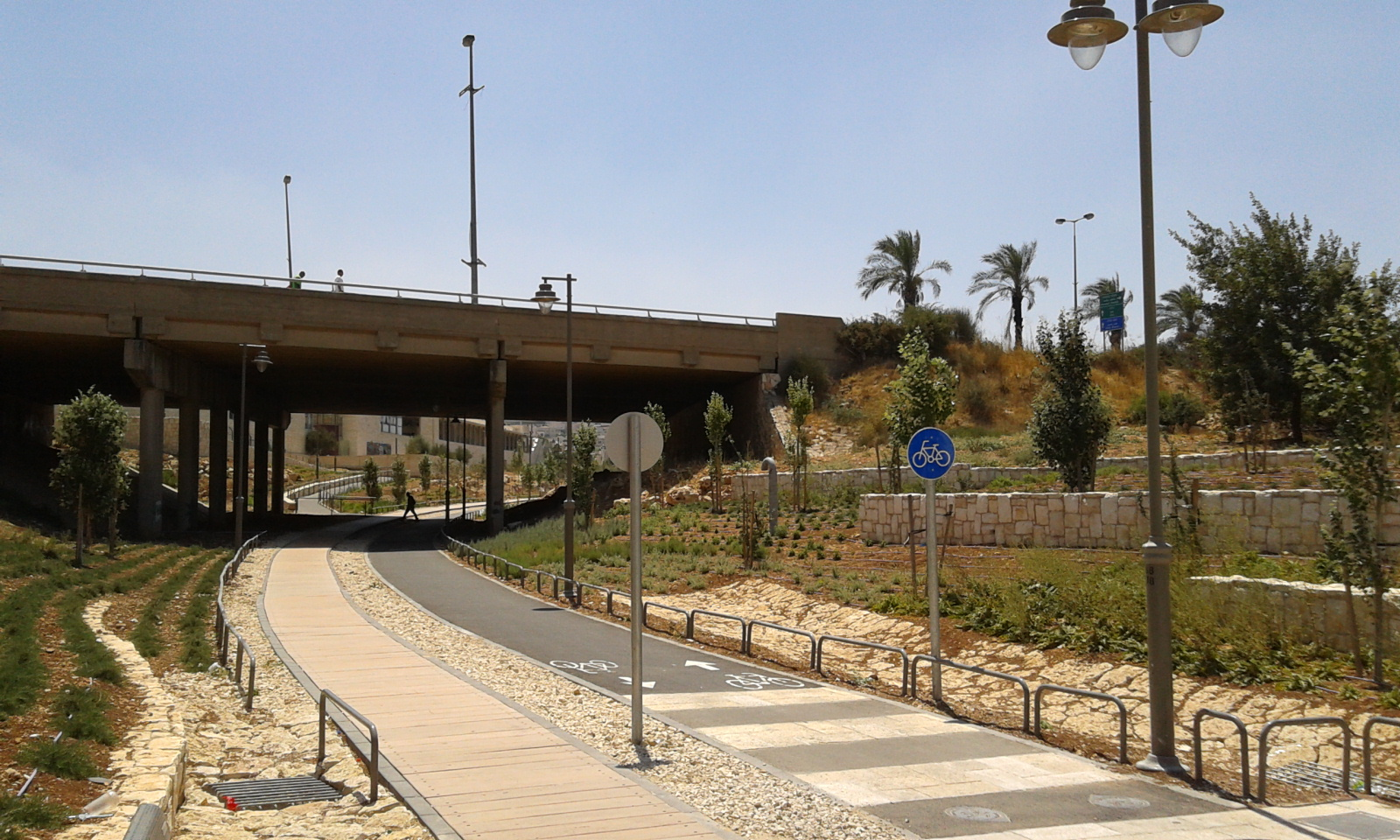
Train Track Park passing under the Dov Yosef Street overpass

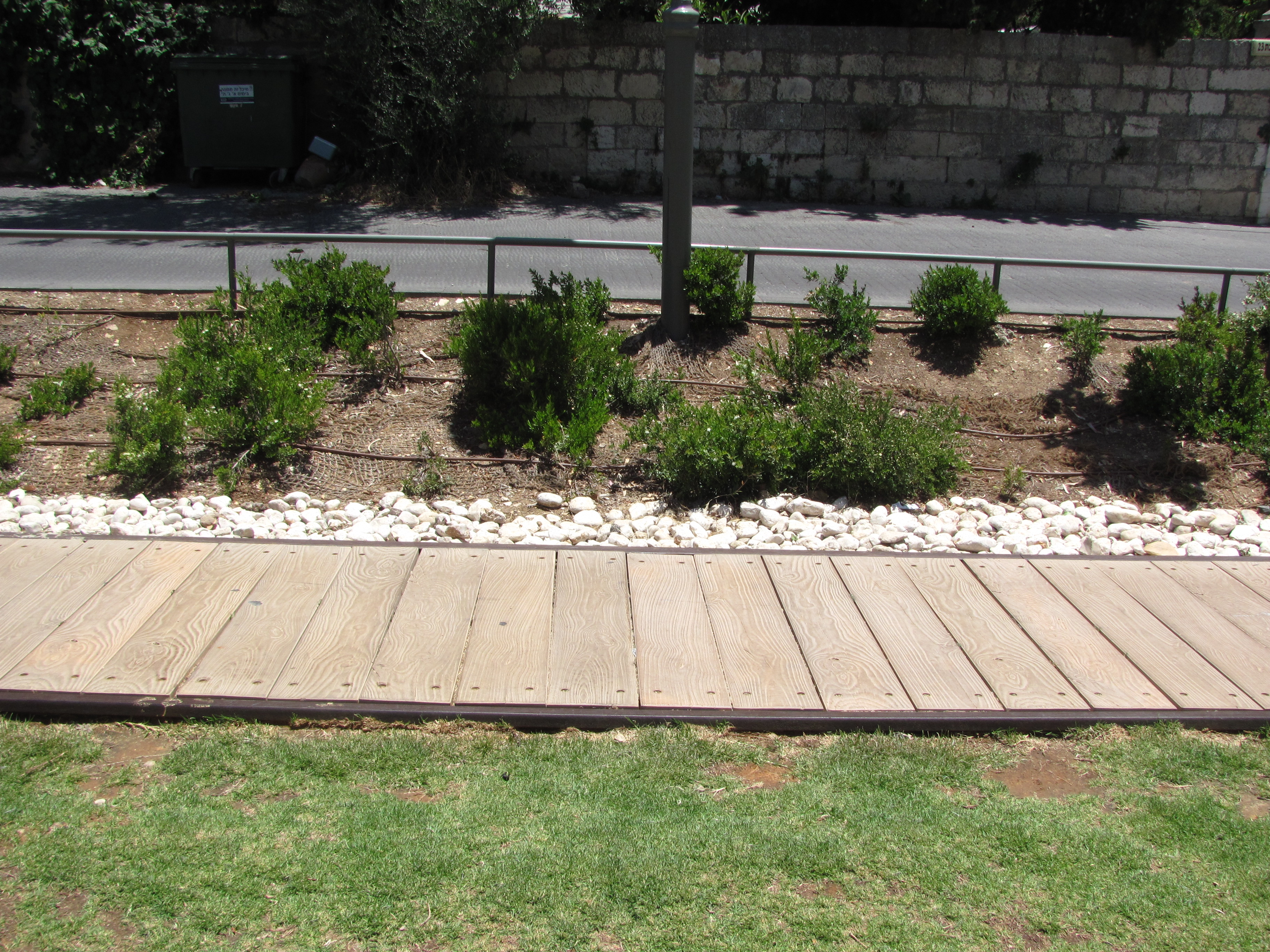
Detail of imitation wood finish on the concrete walking path

The park encompasses approximately 80 dunams (0.080 km^{2}; 0.031 sq mi). It measures 7 kilometres (4.3 mi) in length. Its width ranges from 7–15 metres (23–49 ft) depending on the location and "urban situation". The park is wheelchair accessible.

The pedestrian path is a raised boardwalk made from molded concrete planks with an imitation wood finish, laid directly over the original railroad tracks and ties. Wood was not used for either the walkway or benches in the project due to the Jerusalem municipality's concern for maintenance and prevention of vandalism, and to avoid damage from the occasional snowfall. To the side of the tracks is a paved bicycle path, which will eventually be linked to the Jerusalem Metropolitan Park that will yield 42 kilometres (26 mi) of continuous cycling trails. In between the walking and biking paths in the wider sections is a strip of grass; in narrower sections, ornamental plants border the park. The park was planted with plane trees.

At intersections with side streets or major urban junctions, the architects created small squares with benches, playground equipment, and drinking fountains. The transition between neighborhoods along the route is demarcated by benches and additional lighting. Original railroad accouterments, such as signal boxes, signage, and communication poles, were preserved in some places, and historical markers and photos were posted along the route.

== Use ==
You see Arab women with head scarves walking on Shabbat alongside men returning from the synagogue. The first time I saw professional cyclists from Beit Safafa, I said, 'Here the cultures connect'.

— Yair Avigdor, park architect

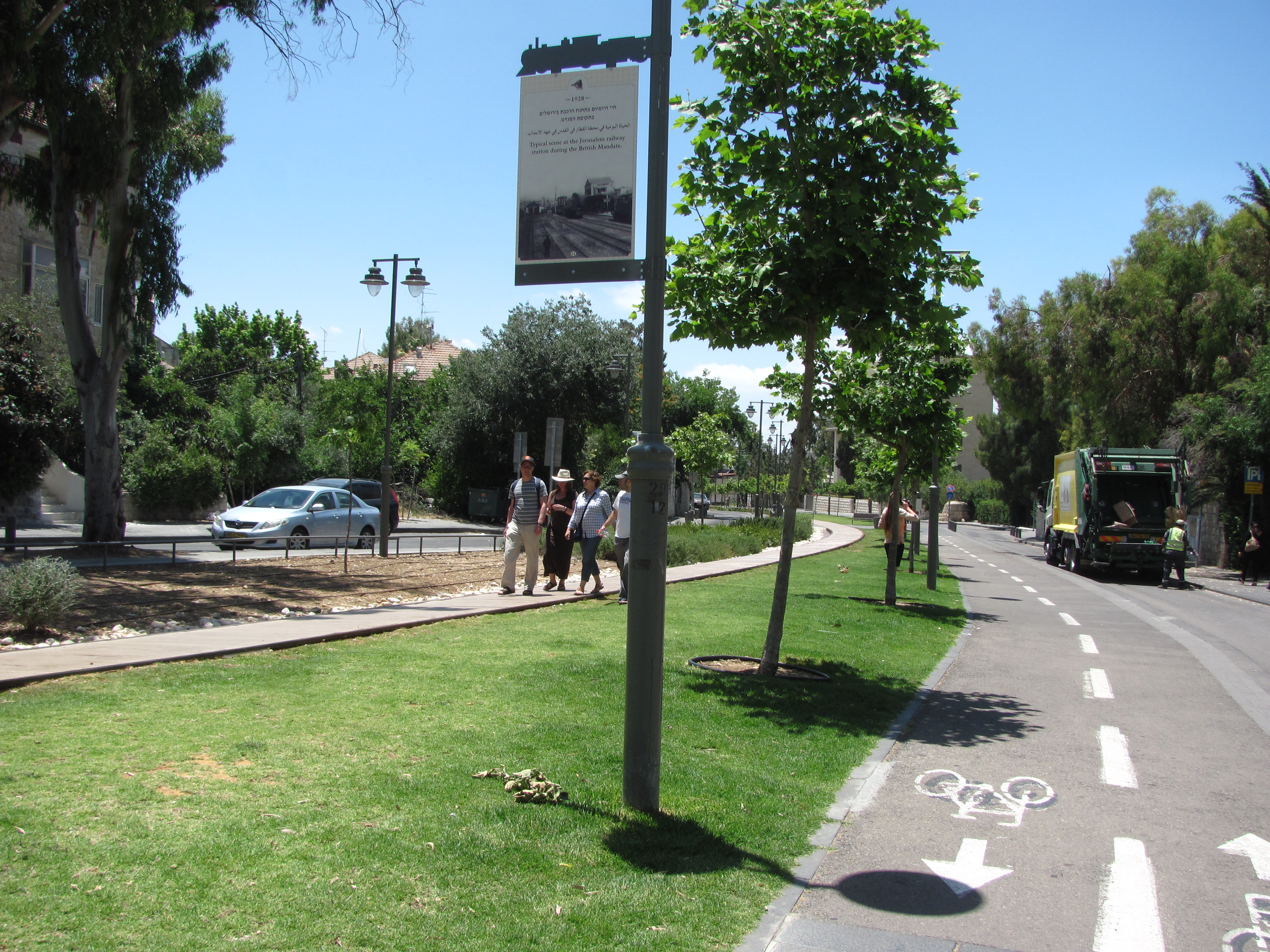
A group strolls on the boardwalk in German Colony; note historical marker

The park is used on a daily basis by walkers, joggers, runners, dog-walkers, families, cyclists, tai chi and yoga enthusiasts, lawn sports players, and bench-sitters. According to a 2015 estimate, "thousands" of people use the park daily. Several juice stands and a stand selling orthotics have been established along the route.

In summer 2015 the Jerusalem Municipality installed two free public reading libraries in the park, converting old bus shelters into open-air bookshelves. Users can borrow books on the honor system, as well as donate books to the project. Books in Hebrew, French, English, and Arabic have been donated to the project.

Unlike other large Jerusalem parks like Sacher Park and the Valley of the Cross which occupy wadis, the Train Track Park is embedded in the urban fabric. Its presence has improved the desirability of the neighborhoods situated along its route, with increased home prices and an influx of younger residents and families with children being seen. The park has also been noted as a symbol of coexistence in the divided city, as it passes through six Jewish and one Arab neighborhood (Beit Safafa) and is used by residents of both. A group called "Runners Without Borders", composed of Jewish and Arab runners, trains here and has become a symbol of the park.

In 2016 residents of the Katamonim neighborhoods protested against a planned extension of the Jerusalem Light Rail which would cut through the park, eliminating about 400 metres (1,300 ft) of it. The continuity of the park is also threatened by a proposed multi-lane highway to be built between Katamonim and the Talpiot industrial zone, which would divide the park between Mekor Chaim and Beit Safafa.

== Awards ==
In 2013 the Train Track Park received the Design Award in the category of urban design at the annual Israel Conference for Architecture and Design. It also received the 2013 Karavan Prize for Landscape and Garden Architecture from the Tel Aviv-Yafo Municipality.

== See also ==
- High Line
