= 2004 Liberty Bell Park bus bombing =

Suicide bombing in Jerusalem

Coordinates: 31.7703°N 35.2228°E

2004 Jerusalem bus No. 14A suicide bombing
- Part of the Second Intifada militancy campaign
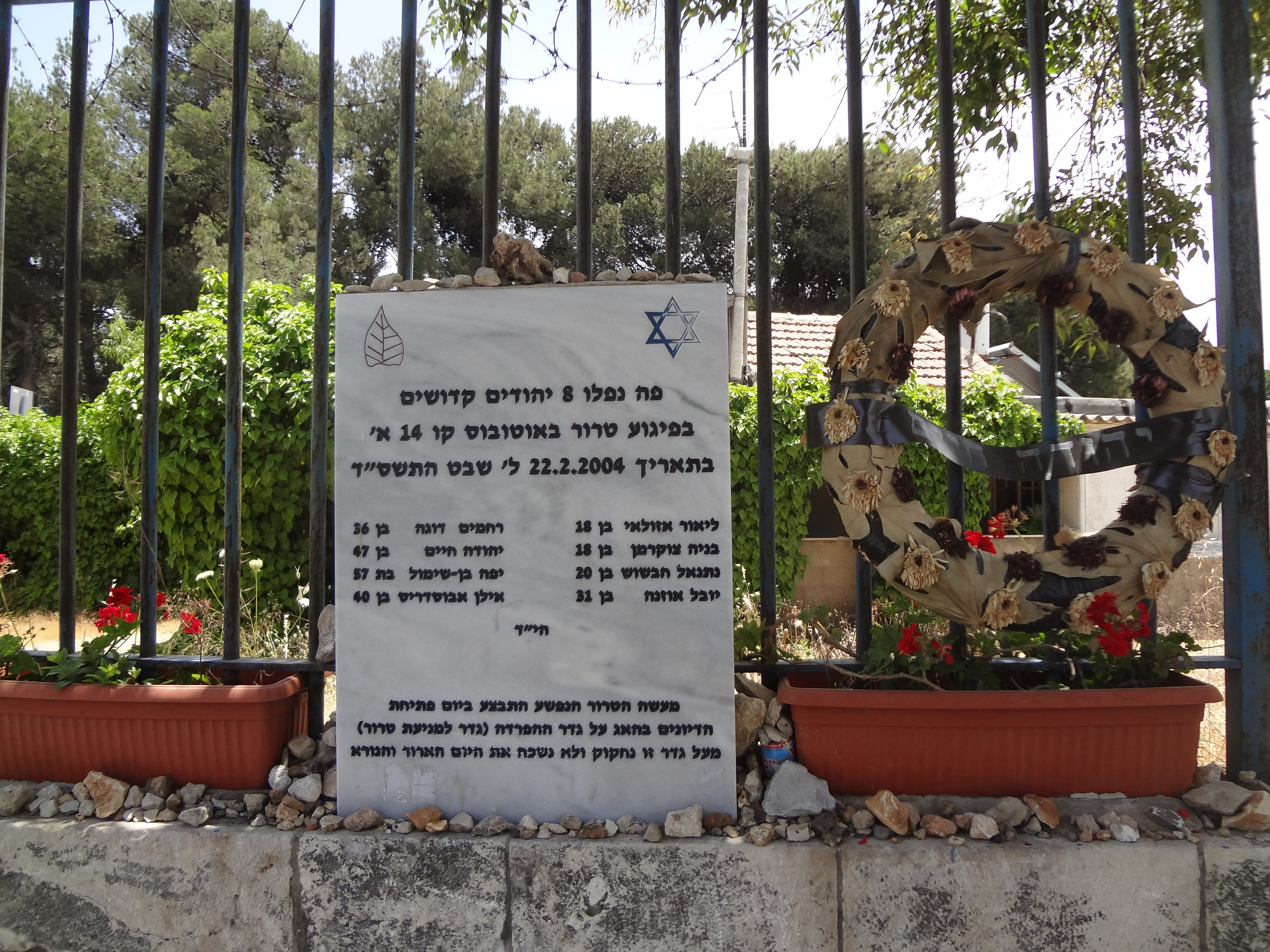
- Memorial plaque for bombing victims

- Location of Jerusalem
- Native name: הפיגוע בקו 14א
- Location: Jerusalem
- Date: February 22, 2004; 22 years ago c. 8:30 am (GMT+2)
- Attack type: Suicide bombing
- Deaths: 8 Israeli civilians (+1 bomber)
- Injuries: 60 Israeli civilians
- Perpetrator: Al-Aqsa Martyrs' Brigades claimed responsibility

The Liberty Bell Park bus bombing was a suicide bombing which occurred on February 22, 2004 in Egged bus No. 14A in Jerusalem. Eight passengers were killed in the attack and over 60 people were injured, many of them were children on their way to school. The Al-Aqsa Martyrs' Brigades claimed responsibility for the attack.

== The attack ==
On Sunday, February 22, 2004, during the morning rush hour, a Palestinian suicide bomber got on the 14a bus traveling to downtown Jerusalem. The suicide bomber had an explosive device hidden in a backpack which was stuffed with metal scraps to maximize casualties. Police believe he boarded the bus in the Talpiot industrial zone.

The suicide bomber waited for the bus to fill up with passengers. At approximately 8:30 am, as the bus passed Liberty Bell park on the edge of Emek Refaim, the main street of the German Colony, he detonated the explosive device.

Eight people were killed in the attack and more than 60 people were injured, 11 of whom were schoolchildren.

== The perpetrator ==
The al-Aqsa Martyrs Brigades claimed responsibility for the attack and stated that the attacker was 23-year-old Mohammed Zaul from the village of Husan in the West Bank. After the attack a video of the suicide bomber was released in which Zaul claimed he carried out the attack in revenge "for the massacre perpetrated by Israel against the Palestinians."

== Official reactions ==
Israeli Foreign Minister Silvan Shalom condemned the attack, citing it as proof that the Israeli West Bank barrier was justified and imperative to prevent such incidents from recurring.

Palestinian National Authority Prime Minister Ahmed Qureia condemned the attack and stated that it gave Israel an excuse to continue building the West Bank barrier.

== See also ==
- Davidka Square bus bombing
