= Baka, Jerusalem =

Neighborhood of Jerusalem

Baka البقعة, בַּקְעָה
- Neighborhood
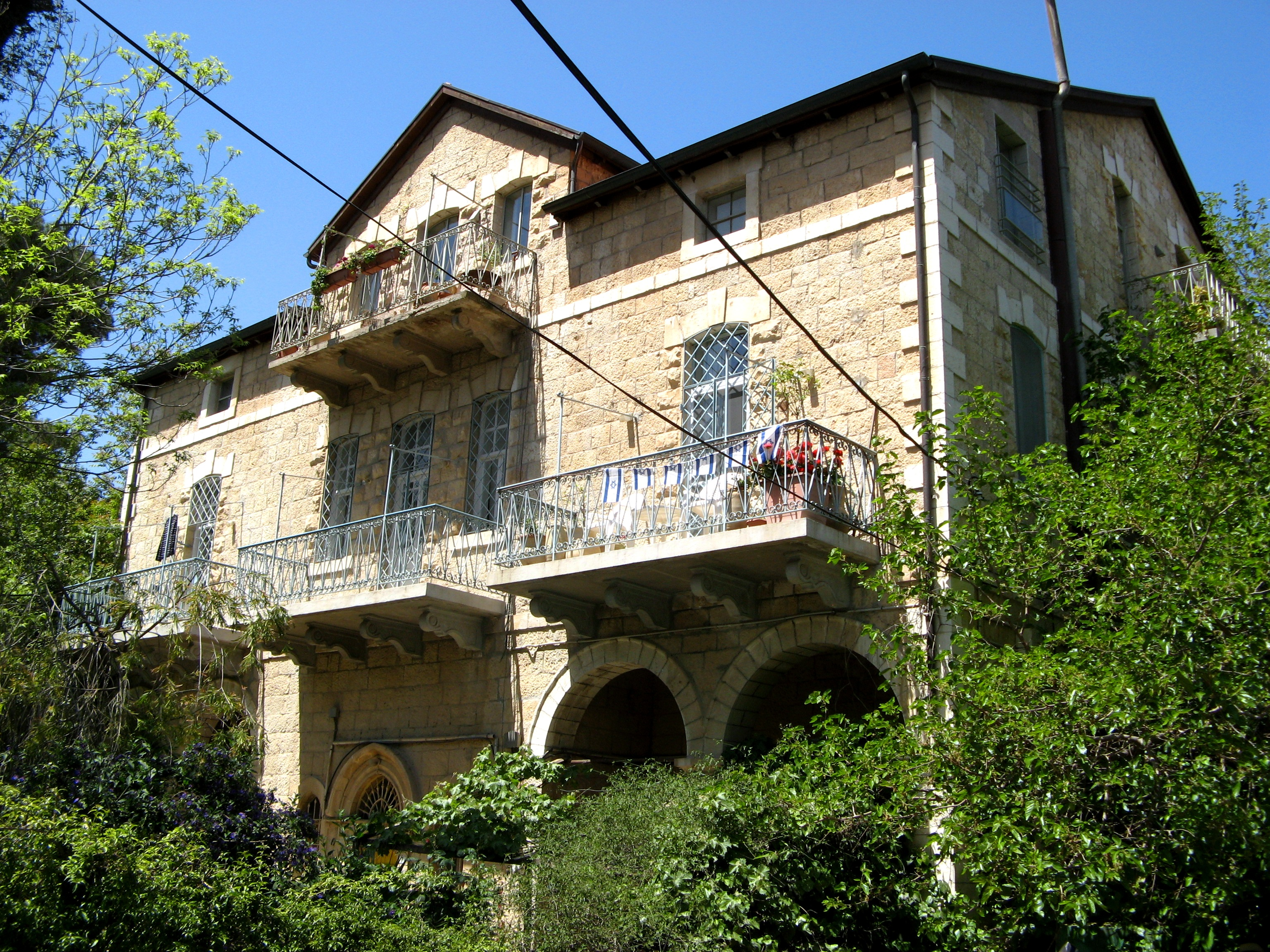
- Interactive map of Baka
- City: Jerusalem
- Established: Late 19th century
- Elevation: 760 m (2,490 ft)

Baka (Arabic: البقعة, lit. "Valley"; Hebrew: בַּקְעָה) is a neighborhood in southern Jerusalem. The official name is Geulim, which is mainly used on road signs.

== Geography ==
The neighborhood is somewhat trapezoidal, sandwiched between Derech Hevron on the east at 760 meters above sea level and sloping downward toward Derech HaRakevet and General Pierre Koenig Street on the western side at 740 meters. The old Jerusalem Railway Station occupies the north-eastern point with Rivka Street forming the southern base. Baka is bounded by Abu Tor to the northeast, Talpiot to the east, Talpiot Industrial Zone to the south, Mekor Chaim to the west, and the Greek Colony and German Colony to the northwest. The north-south Derech Beit Lehem serves as the major commercial artery within the neighborhood.

== History ==
Baka was established in the late 19th century after the completion of the Jerusalem Railway Station. The station created the nucleus of a commercial center that eventually attracted mostly wealthy Muslim, Christian, and Armenian families from the Old City, who built mansions there in the 1920s. The neighborhood had an agricultural character until the 1950s.

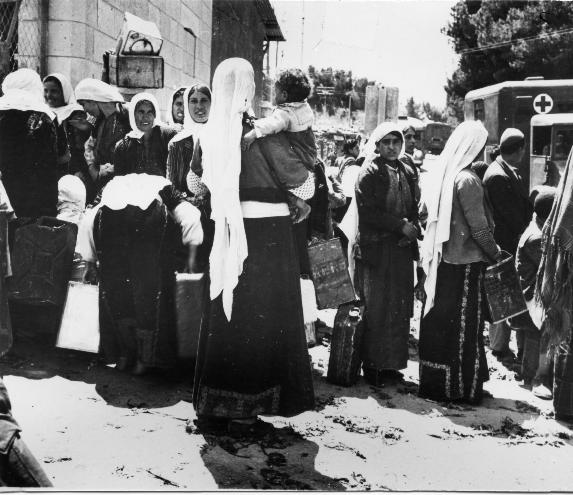
Water distribution in Baka, 1948

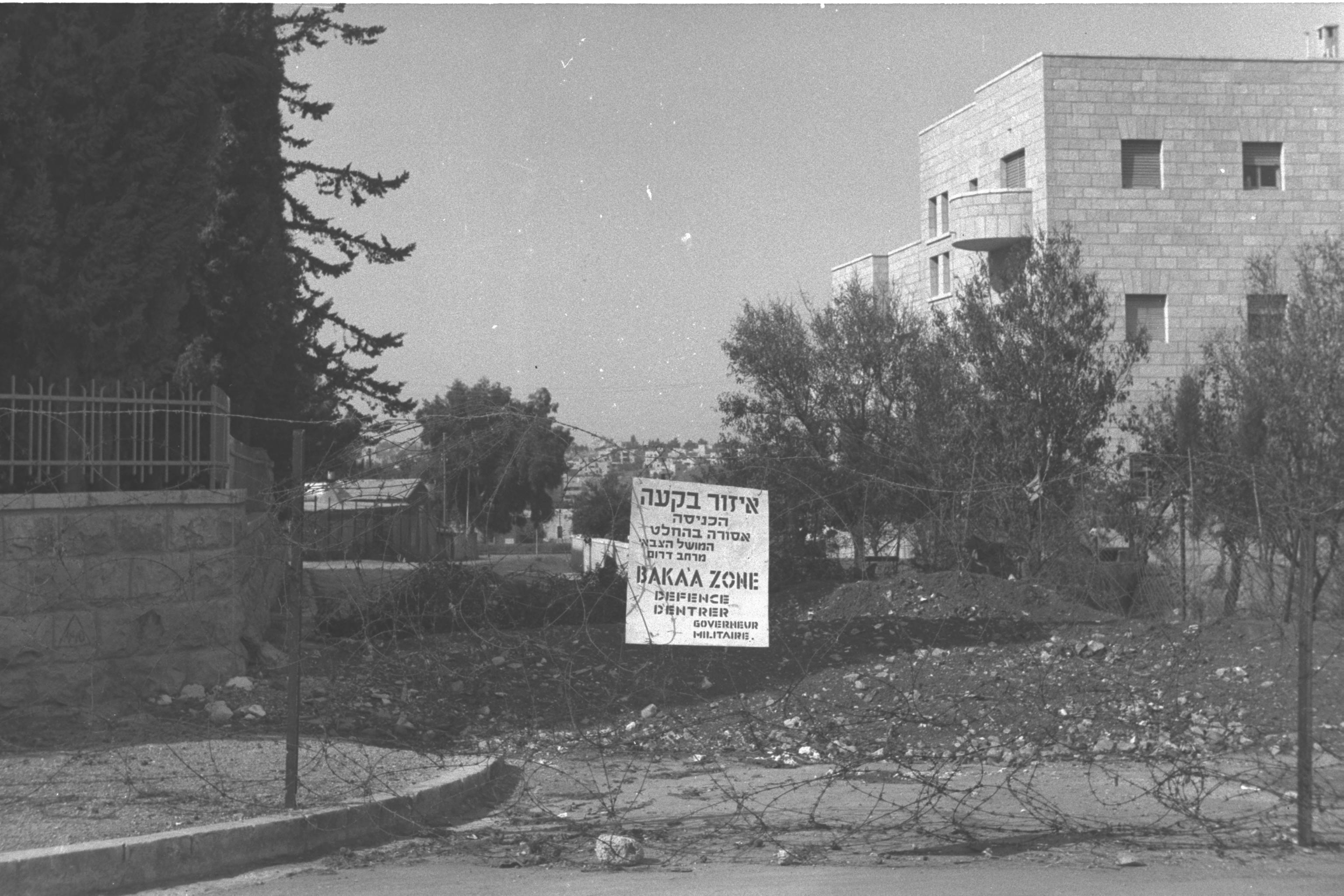
Baka as a military zone, 1948

During the 1948 Arab–Israeli War, the neighborhood was left on the Israeli (western) side of the dividing line between West Jerusalem and East Jerusalem. Its population changed, as was the case with many neighborhoods on both sides of the dividing line.

After 1948, many streets in Baka were renamed for the Twelve Tribes of Israel: Judah, Issachar, Levi, Zevulun, Reuven, Shimon, Gad, Ephraim, Menashe, Benjamin, Dan, Asher and Naphtali.

== Baka today ==
In the late 1970s and early 1980s, Baka experienced a significant change as middle class professionals began to move in. Many of the palatial homes were renovated, while some of the larger mansions from the Mandate period were subdivided into luxury apartments. Demographically, the neighborhood contains a mix of religious and secular Jews and is popular among English and French-speaking immigrants. The main commercial street, Derech Beit Lehem, is lined with shops, designer stores, coffee houses, restaurants and more.

== Schools and public institutions ==
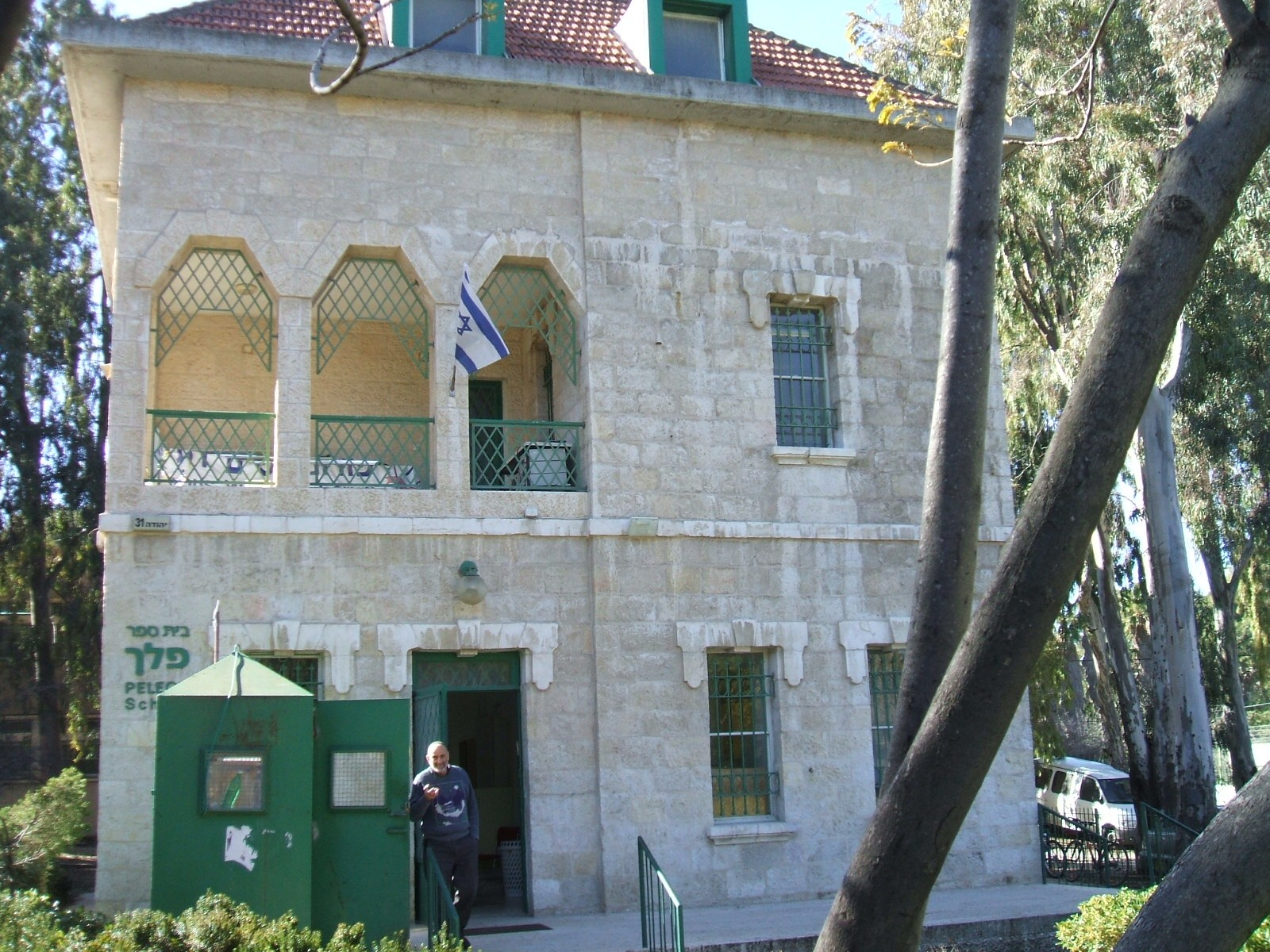
Pelech Girls School

Schools in Baka include Oranim, Efrata, Geulim A, and Pelech, a religious high school for girls.

Ulpan Etzion, Israel's first Hebrew-language school, was established in Baka in 1949. The ulpan, directed by Mordechai Kamerat, was used as a model for Hebrew language teaching all over Israel. In 2008, the school vacated its college-style dormitories, communal rooms and gardens after the lease expired with the Carmelite Church that owned the property.

== Recreation and parks ==
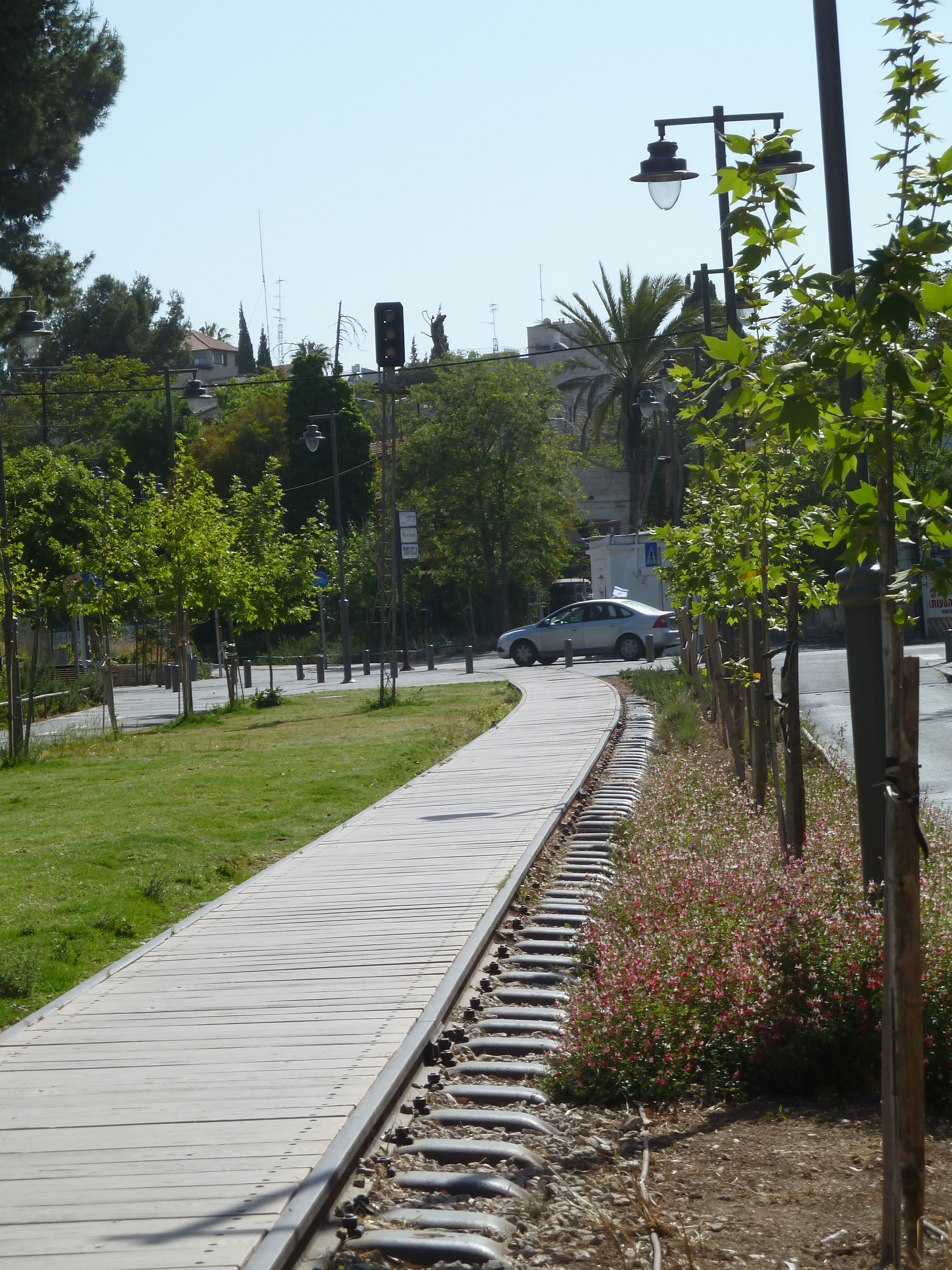
A section of Park HaMesila, Baka

The Train Track Park (Park HaMesila), the longest bike path in Jerusalem and one of the major recreation areas in the city, runs along Derech HaRekevet on the western edge of Baka.

== Gallery ==
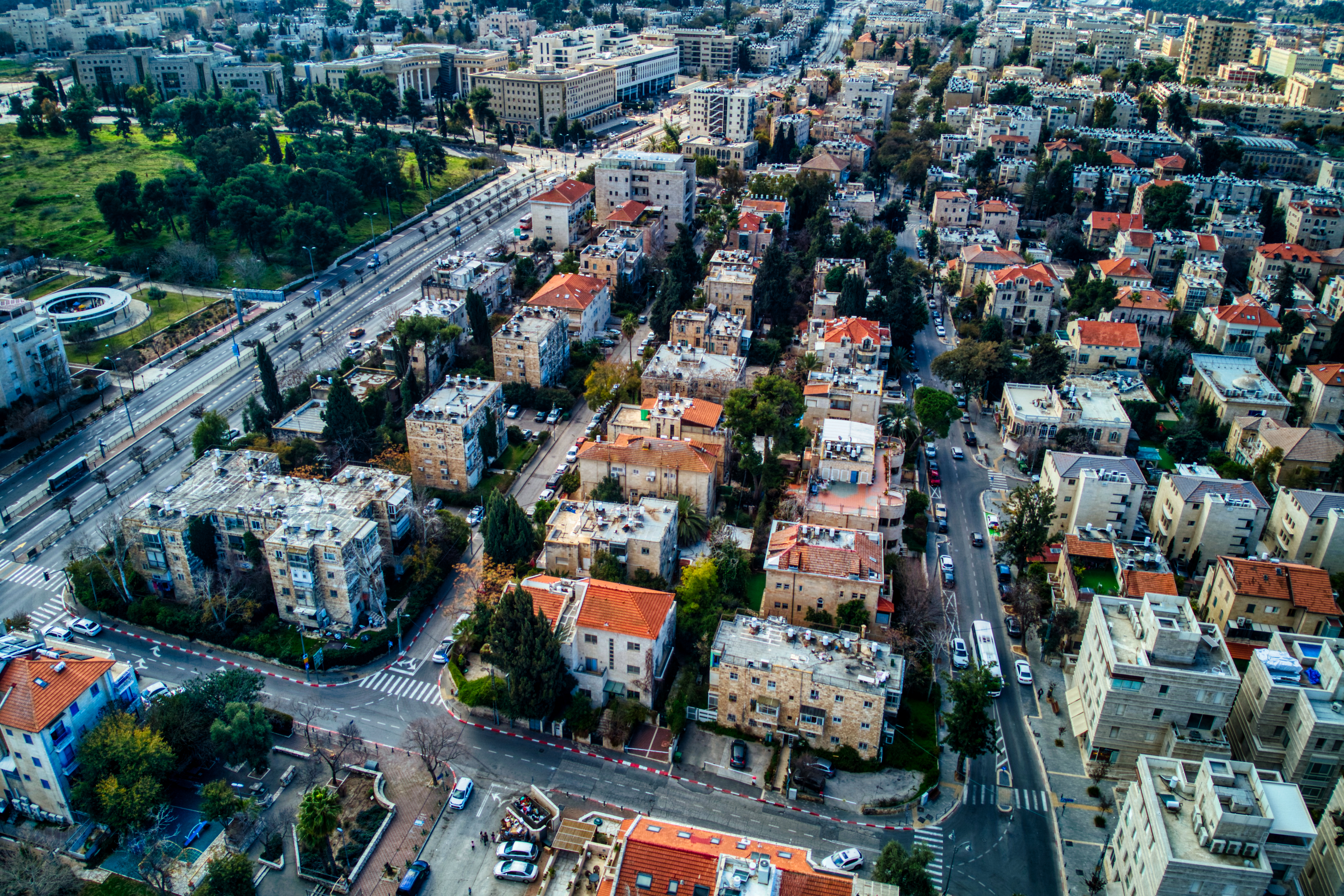
Baka East to Beit Lehem Road

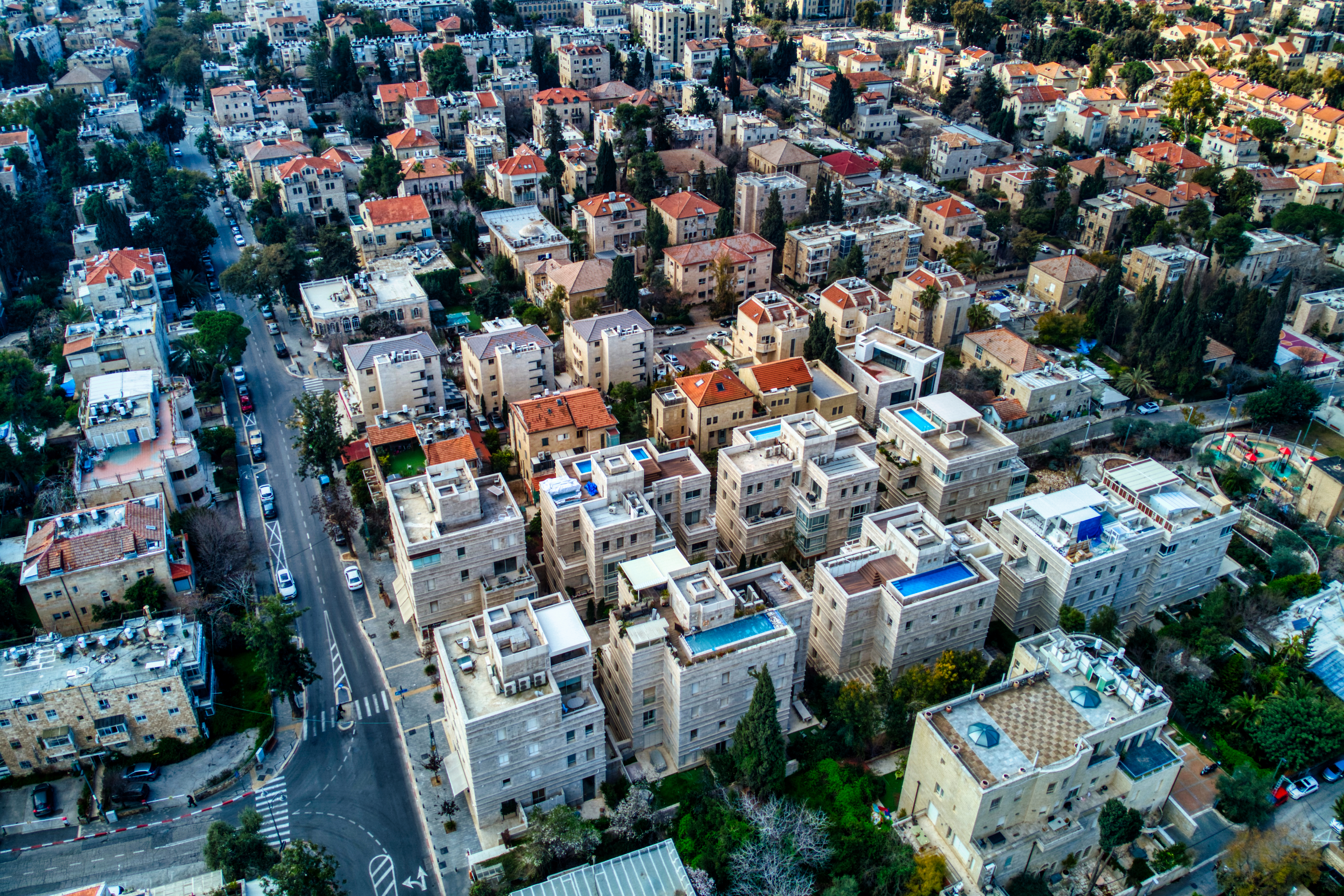
Baka West to Beit Lehem Road

== Notable residents ==
- Andi Arnovitz, American-Israeli artist
- Robert Aumann, winner of the Nobel Memorial Prize in Economic Sciences
- Ron Dermer, former Ambassador and Minister
- Daniel Gordis, scholar and writer
- Michael Greilsammer, musician and songwrite
- Yaakov Katz, author and columnist, former editor of The Jerusalem Post
- Jonathan Medved, investor
- Saul Singer, writer
- Daniel Taub, former Ambassador
