= Valley of Rephaim =

Valley southwest of Jerusalem, Israel

Coordinates: 31°45′47.53″N 35°13′8.84″E

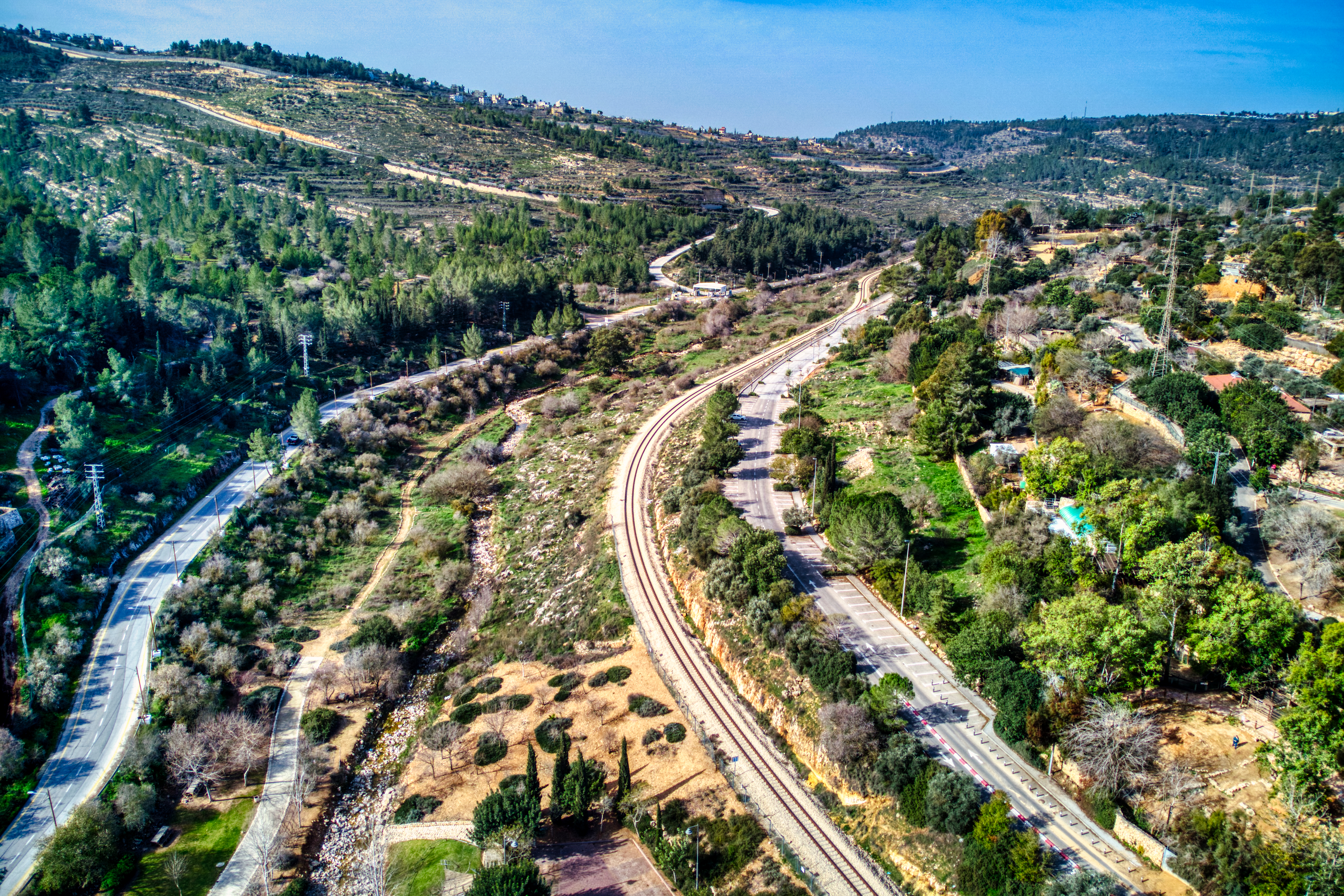
Jaffa–Jerusalem railway and Valley of Rephaim near Jerusalem

The Valley of Rephaim (Hebrew: עמק רפאים, Emeq Rephaim) (Joshua 15:8; Joshua 18:16, R.V.) is a valley descending southwest from Jerusalem to Nahal Sorek below. It is an ancient route from the coastal plain to the Judean Hills, probably named after the legendary race of giants. Emek Refaim (Hebrew: עמק רפאים), the German Colony in Jerusalem, takes its name from this valley.

== Biblical narrative ==
When David became king over all Israel, the Philistines, judging that he would now become their uncompromising enemy, made a sudden attack upon Hebron, compelling David to retire from it. He sought refuge in "the hold" at Adullam (2 Samuel 5:17–22), and the Philistines took up their position in (or raided) the valley of Rephaim, on the west and south-west of Jerusalem. Thus all communication between Bethlehem and Jerusalem was intercepted. While David and his army were encamped here, there occurred the battle narrated in 2 Samuel 5:17–25 and 1 Chronicles 14:8–12. Having obtained divine direction, David led his army against the Philistines, and gained a complete victory over them. The scene of this victory was afterwards called Baal-perazim.

A second time, however, the Philistines rallied their forces in this valley (2 Samuel 5:22 and 1 Chronicles 14:13–16). Again, warned by a divine saying about hearing a marching sound in the tops of the baka trees (הבכאים, KJV "mulberry trees", most modern versions "balsam"), David led his army to Gibeon, and attacked the Philistines from the south, inflicting on them another severe defeat, and chasing them with great slaughter to Gezer. There David kept in check these enemies of Israel and in consequence his fame grew.

== Archaeology ==
One of the ancient farming complexes excavated in the Valley of Rephaim is Er-Ras, an Iron Age terraced farm.

== Railway ==
The Tel Aviv – Jerusalem railway, originally known as the Jaffa–Jerusalem railway, uses the entire length of the Valley of the Rephaim from Jerusalem to its junction with Nahal Sorek.

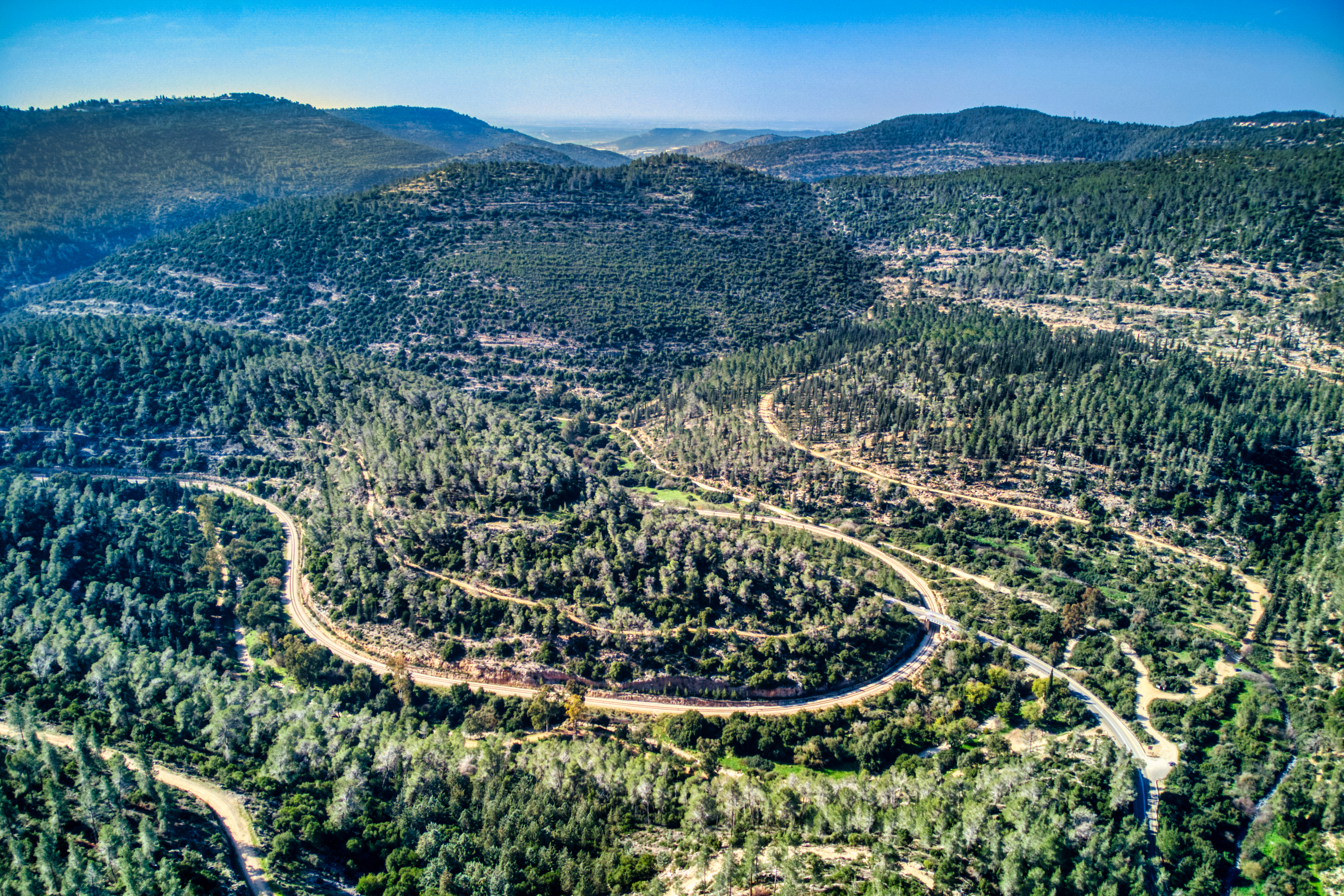
Refaim Bridge, at which the Jaffa–Jerusalem railway is passing below Road 386, at the point Valley of Rephaim is entering Valley of Sorek

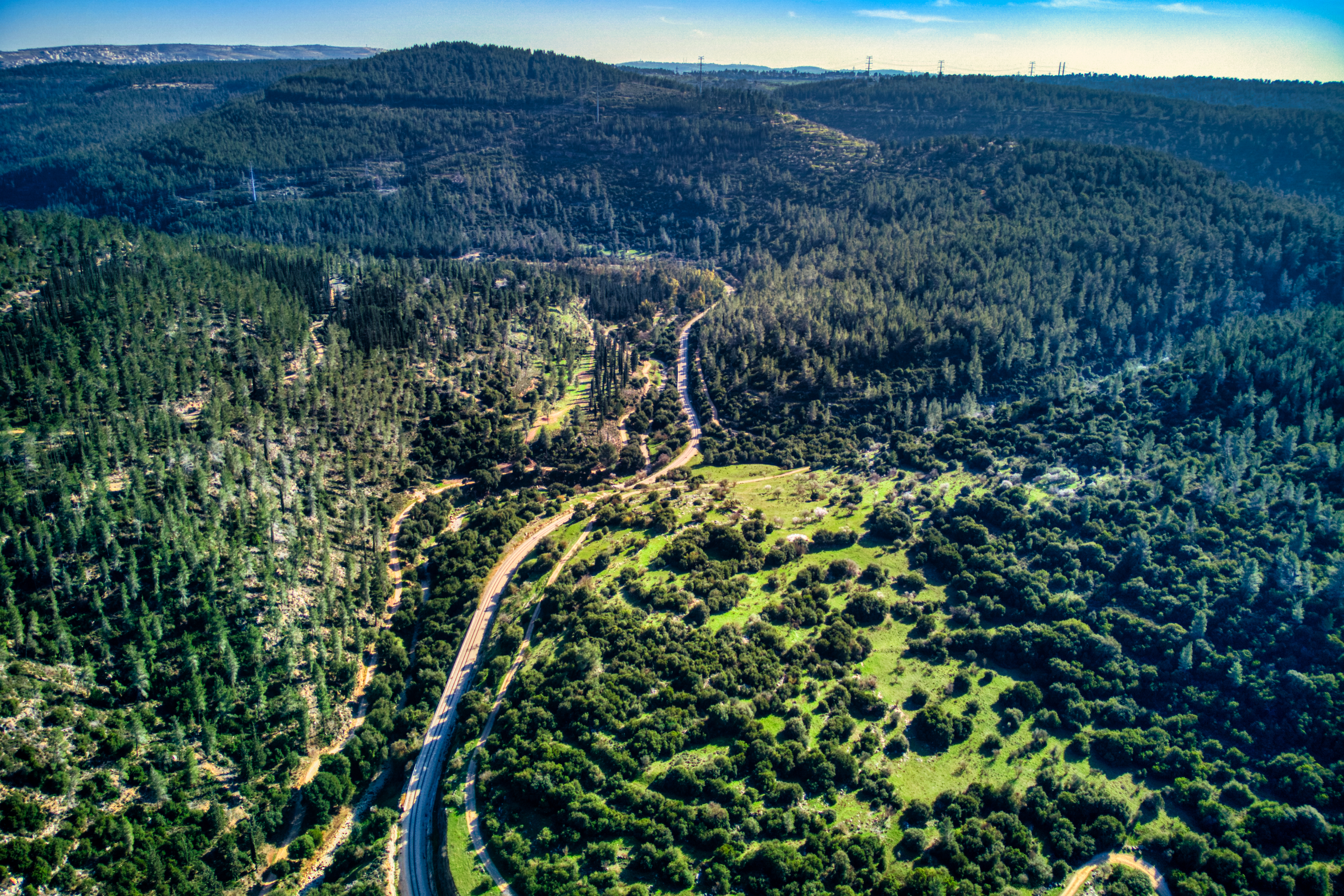
Jaffa–Jerusalem railway and Valley of Rephaim in the Judaean Mountains

== See also ==
- 'Ain el-Haniya spring, also spelled Ein Haniya, Al-Walaja village, Refa'im Valley Park
