= Ya'akov Katz =

Ya'akov Katz may refer to:

- Yaakov Katz (journalist), Israeli author and government advisor
- Ya'akov Katz (politician born 1906), Israeli politician who served as a member of the Knesset for Poalei Agudat Yisrael
- Ya'akov Katz (politician born 1951), Israeli politician who served as a member of the Knesset for the National Union
