= German Colony, Jerusalem =

Neighborhood in Jerusalem, originally a 19th-century German Templer settlement

Coordinates: 31°45′47.4″N 35°13′15.79″E

German Colony Hebrew: המושבה הגרמנית
- Neighborhood of Jerusalem
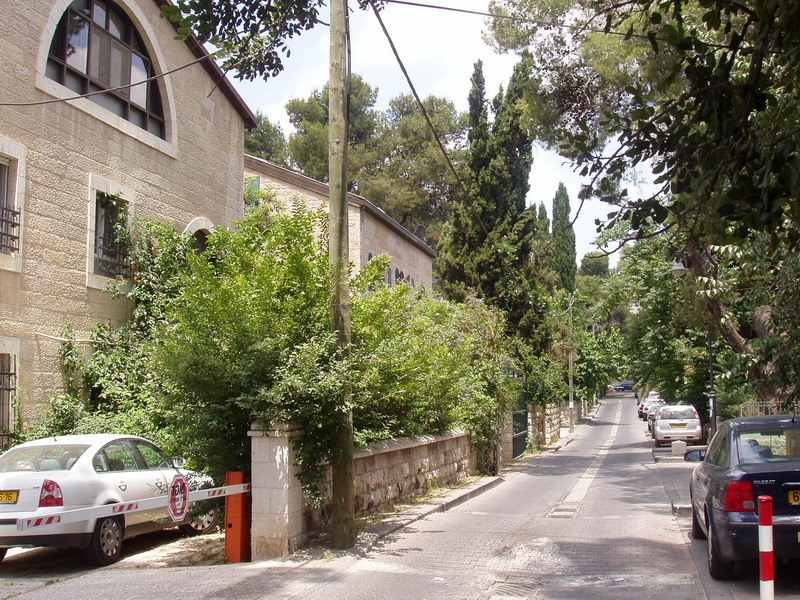
- Cremieux Street
- Interactive map of German Colony
- Country: Israel
- District: Jerusalem District
- City: Jerusalem
- Foundation: 1873
- Founder: German Templer Society

Population (2017)
  - Total: 1,930

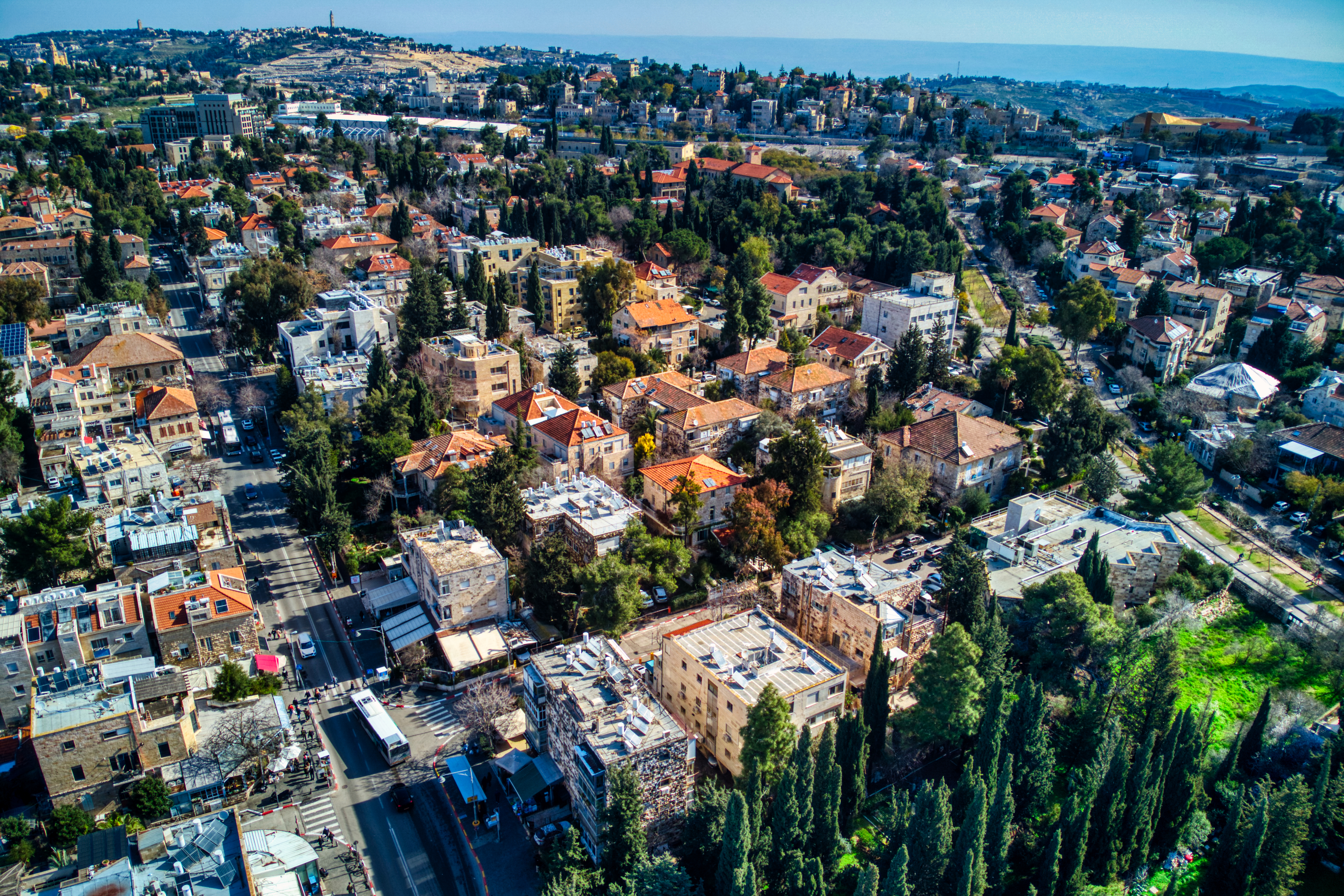
German Colony of Jerusalem

The German Colony (Hebrew: המושבה הגרמנית, HaMoshava HaGermanit) is a neighborhood in Jerusalem, established in the second half of the 19th century as a German Templer colony in Palestine. Today "the Moshava", as it is popularly known, is an upscale neighborhood bisected by Emek Refaim Street, an avenue lined with trendy shops, restaurants, and cafes.

== History ==
=== Biblical era ===
Valley of Rephaim is mentioned in the Book of Joshua and in the Second Book of Samuel. The name is derived from a legendary race of giants who lived in this region in biblical times.

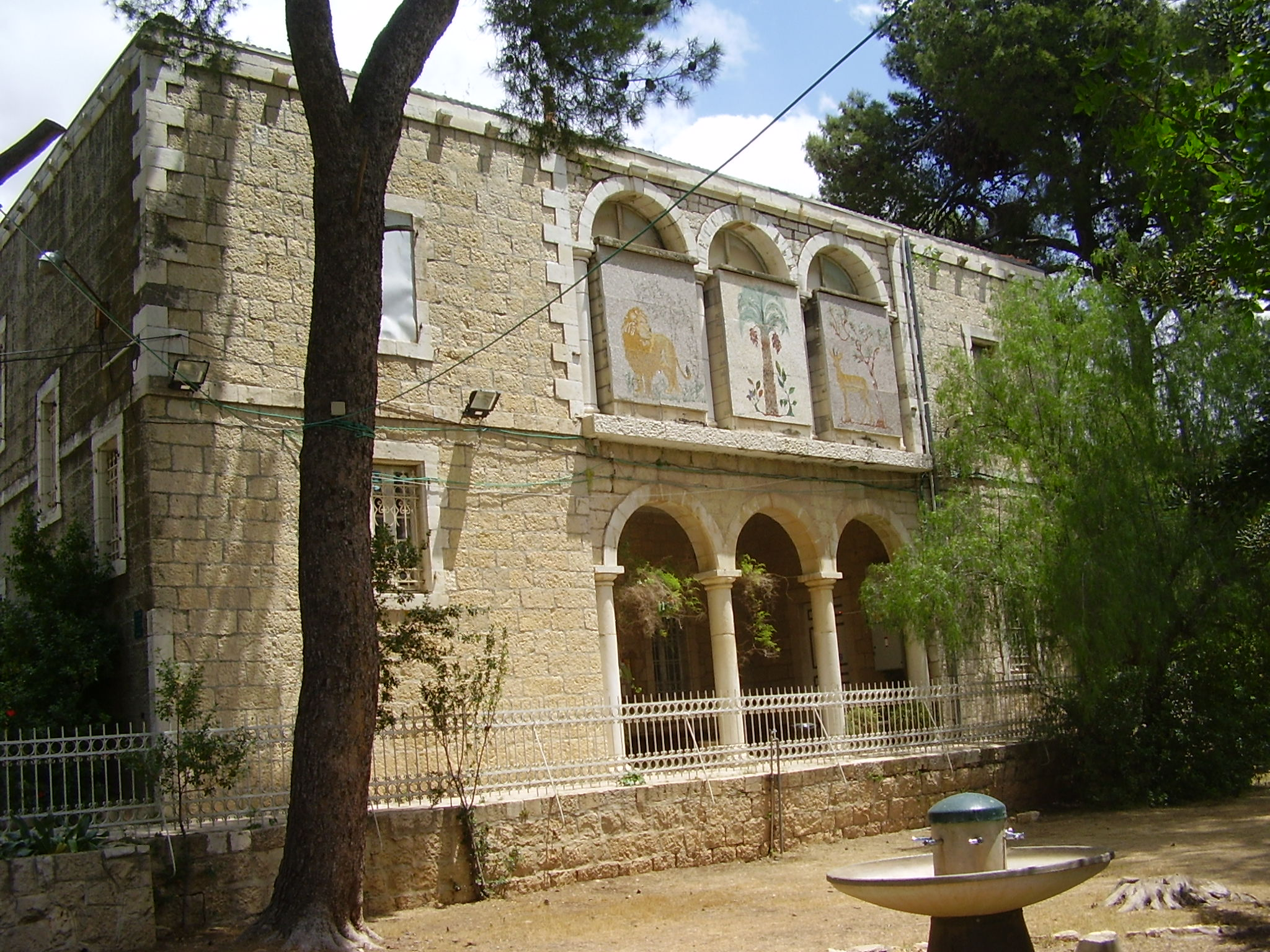
Natural History Museum, German Colony

=== Templer settlement ===
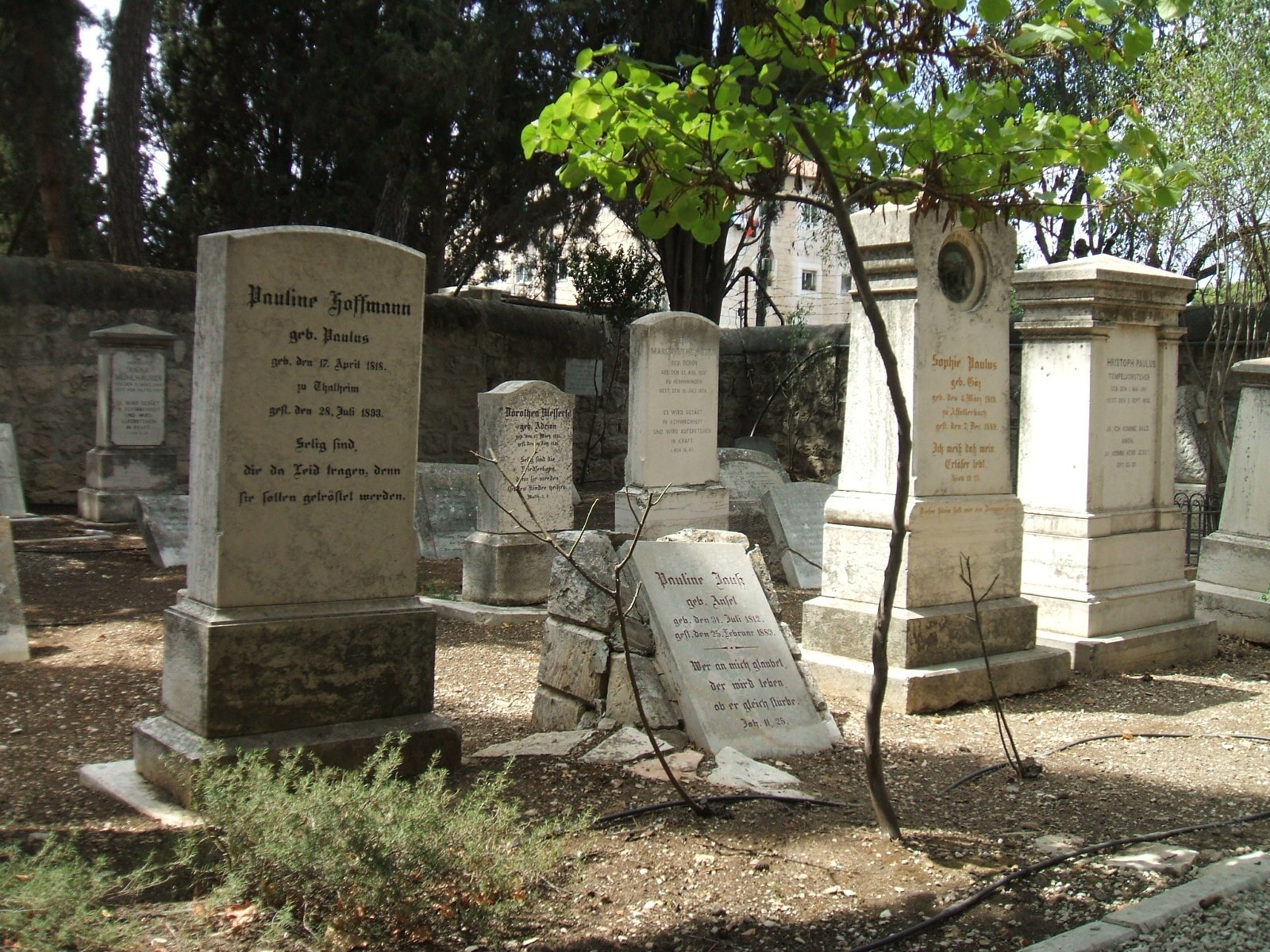
Templer Cemetery

In 1873, after establishing colonies in Haifa and Jaffa, members of the Templer sect from Württemberg, Germany, settled on a large tract of land in the Refaim Valley, southwest of the Old City of Jerusalem. The land was purchased by one of the colonists, Matthäus Frank, from the Arabs of Beit Safafa. The Templers were Christians who broke away from the Protestant church and encouraged their members to settle in the Holy Land to prepare for Messianic salvation. They built their homes in the style to which they were accustomed in Germany - farmhouses of one or two stories, with slanting tiled roofs and shuttered windows, but using local materials such as Jerusalem stone instead of wood and bricks. The colonists engaged in agriculture and traditional trades such as carpentry and blacksmithing. Their homes ran along two parallel streets that would become Emek Refaim and Bethlehem Road. Friedrich (Fritz) Kübler, a German-born butcher, settled in the Germany Colony in 1870. He raised livestock there and built a slaughterhouse on his property. His son took over the meat business after the father's death and became one of the largest meat suppliers in Jerusalem. His clients were hotels, monasteries, hostels and hospitals. An apartment in the Kübler house, on Adolphe Cremieux Street, which still has a water trough in the yard, was purchased by former Prime Minister of Israel, Ehud Olmert.

The British Mandatory government deported the German Templers during World War II. As some of them sympathized with the German Nazi regime, they were considered enemy citizens. Some of them resettled in Australia.

Templer Cemetery

Templers of the German colony in Jerusalem that passed away were initially buried in the Protestant cemetery on Mount Zion.

Several years later, Samuel Gobat, the bishop, declared that they were "no longer Christians" and hence would not be buried there. The widow of Templer Peter Schmidt bought a block of land south of the settlement in 1878. It was designated for the interment of Templers, and her husband was the first to be laid to rest there.

The community's leaders, notably their leader Christoph Hoffman and his son Christoph Hoffman II, are interred in the western section of the cemetery next to the entrance.

At the back of the cemetery there is a mass grave of those who were buried in the German colonies in Jaffa, Sarona and Wilhelma whose graves were moved to Jerusalem between 1952 and 1970.

=== Christian Arab settlement ===
As the neighborhood expanded south along the valley, many of the lots were purchased by well-to-do Christian Arab families who were attracted by its location between the road to Bethlehem and the developing neighborhoods of Katamon, Talbiya, and Baka. These neighborhoods were populated by some of Jerusalem's wealthiest Arabs.

One of the most famous Christian families in Hebron (Khalil) is Abu Gharbieh, which helped to improve the foundations of the city.

=== State of Israel ===
The Arab residents of Katamon fled in 1948, in the wake of fierce battles for control of the area during the Arab–Israeli War. The abandoned homes in the German Colony and other parts of Katamon were used to house new immigrants. Since the end of the 20th century, the neighborhood has undergone a process of gentrification. Efforts are being made to restore old landmark buildings and incorporate some of their architectural features, such as arched windows and tiled roofs, in new construction. Numerous cafes, bars, restaurants, and boutiques have opened in the neighborhood, and many affluent families have moved there, pushing up the price of real estate. The German Colony has a large English-speaking population, with the English speaking community comprising both families and singles, permanent immigrants and visitors. The neighborhood was home to the Smadar Theater, once a gathering place for the artisterati.

During the Second Intifada, in September 2003, a Palestinian suicide bomber blew himself up outside Café Hillel on Emek Refaim Street, killing seven people. In February 2004, another suicide bombing took place on bus #14a as it was leaving the neighborhood northwards. Eight were killed. A small stone monument was erected on top of the fence of the old train station, facing the location of the attack. It is visible from the main northern entrance to the German Colony, across from Liberty Bell Park.

== Architecture and street names ==
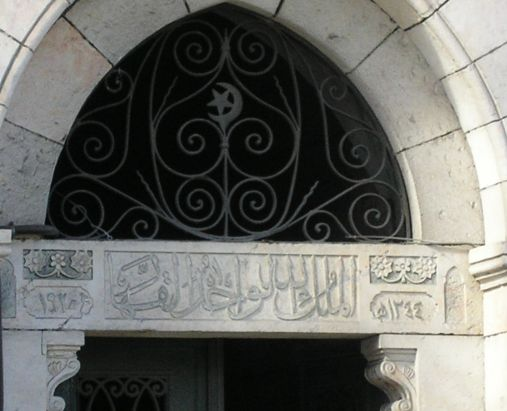
Lintel with Arabic inscription from 1925

The colorful history of the German Colony is illustrated by the mix of architectural styles found within a relatively small area. One finds Swabian-style homes, examples of late provincial Ottoman architecture and British Art Deco from the Mandatory period, within close proximity. An example of British architecture is the Scottish Hospice and St Andrew's Church, built in 1927, decorated with local Armenian tilework. Some of the Templer homes have biblical inscriptions in German on their lintels, in Fraktur script.

The side streets of the German Colony are named for Gentile supporters of Zionism and the Jewish people. Apart from the French author Émile Zola, Czech president Tomas Masaryk, Adolphe Crémieux and South African prime minister Jan Smuts, many of the streets are named for Britons: Liberal Prime Minister David Lloyd George, British Labour Party MP Josiah Wedgwood, Colonel John Henry Patterson, commander of the Jewish Legion in World War I, and pro-Zionist British general Wyndham Deedes.

== Parks and recreation ==
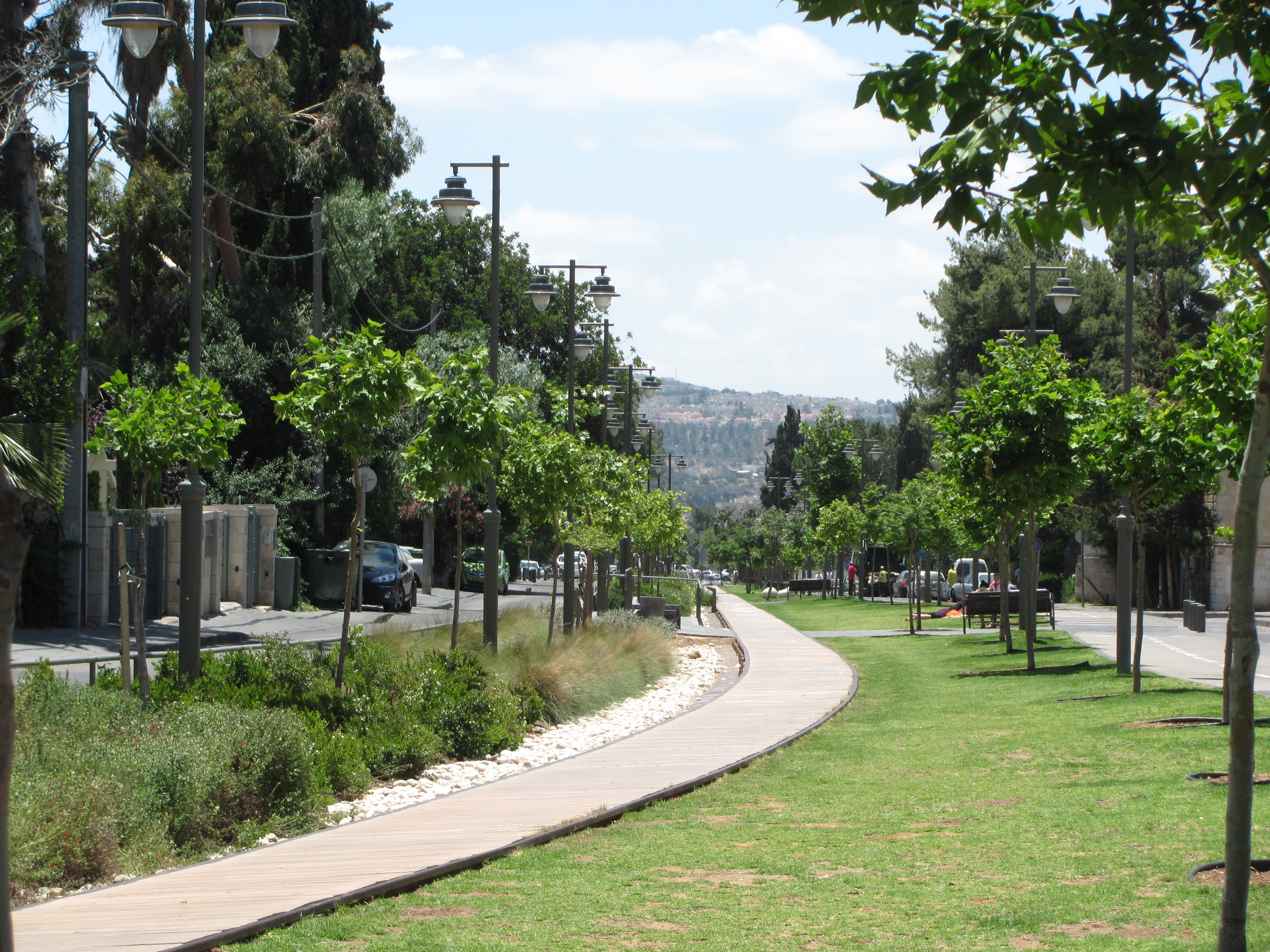
Train Track Park

The Park HaMesila (Train Track Park) runs along the German Colony's southern border with Baka. This former train track was converted into a park approximately 7 km in length and the portion that borders the German Colony has been extensively landscaped. There is a 'Bus Stop Library' located at the junction of the park and Masaryk Street where residents can donate unwanted books or find reading material.

== Landmarks ==
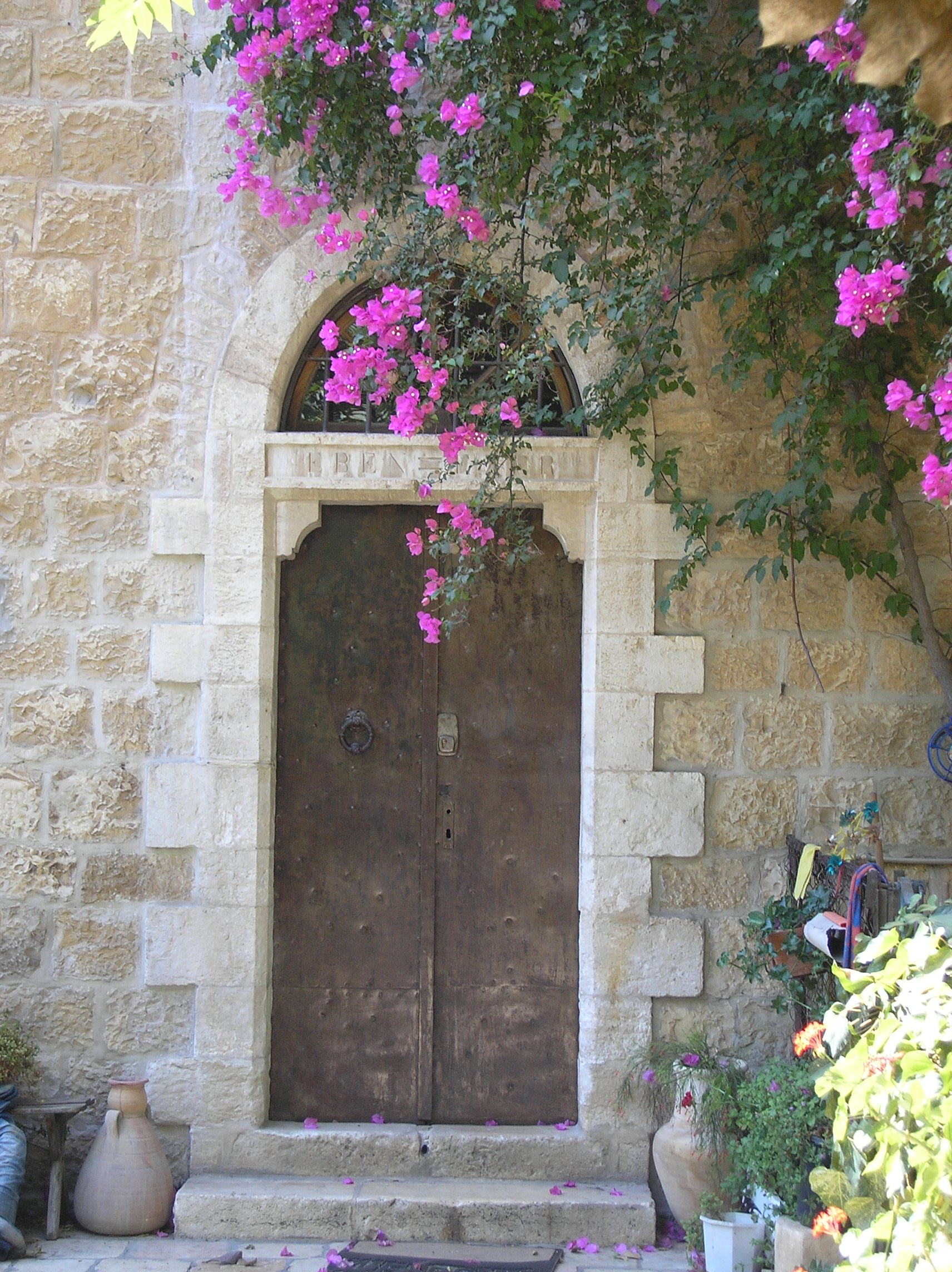
Frank House on Emek Refaim Street

- Gemeindehaus, communal hall – 1 Emek Refaim Street
- Friedrich Aberle House – 10 Emek Refaim Street
- Matthäus Frank House – 6 Emek Refaim Street
- Pension Schmidt
- Lev Smadar Theater – formerly Orient Cinema, Lloyd George Street
- Convent of Borromean Sisters – 12 Lloyd George Street
- Templer Cemetery – 39 Emek Refaim Street
- Imberger House
- Shalom Hartman Institute – 11 Gedalyahu Alon Street
- Kivunim Gap Year Headquarters, Yemin Moshe Street

== Development plans ==
For years, developers tried to build up the area at the northern entrance to the neighborhood, overlooking Liberty Bell Park. Mass protests in the early 1970s failed to halt the construction of a high-rise apartment building, known as the Omariya compound. In the wake of protests by environmentalists and neighborhood activists, the plans were altered, and the height of a planned 14-story hotel was cut to seven stories.

According to current plans, the Blue Line of the light rail is slated to run along the route of Emek Refaim Street - this, despite opposition from some local residents.

== Notable residents ==
- Batya Gur, Israeli novelist
- Charles Winters, American businessman
- Gerald M. Steinberg, Academic and Political Activist
- Yedidia Stern, Jurist and legal scholar
