= Liberty Bell Park =

Coordinates: 31°46′13.00″N 35°13′22.19″E

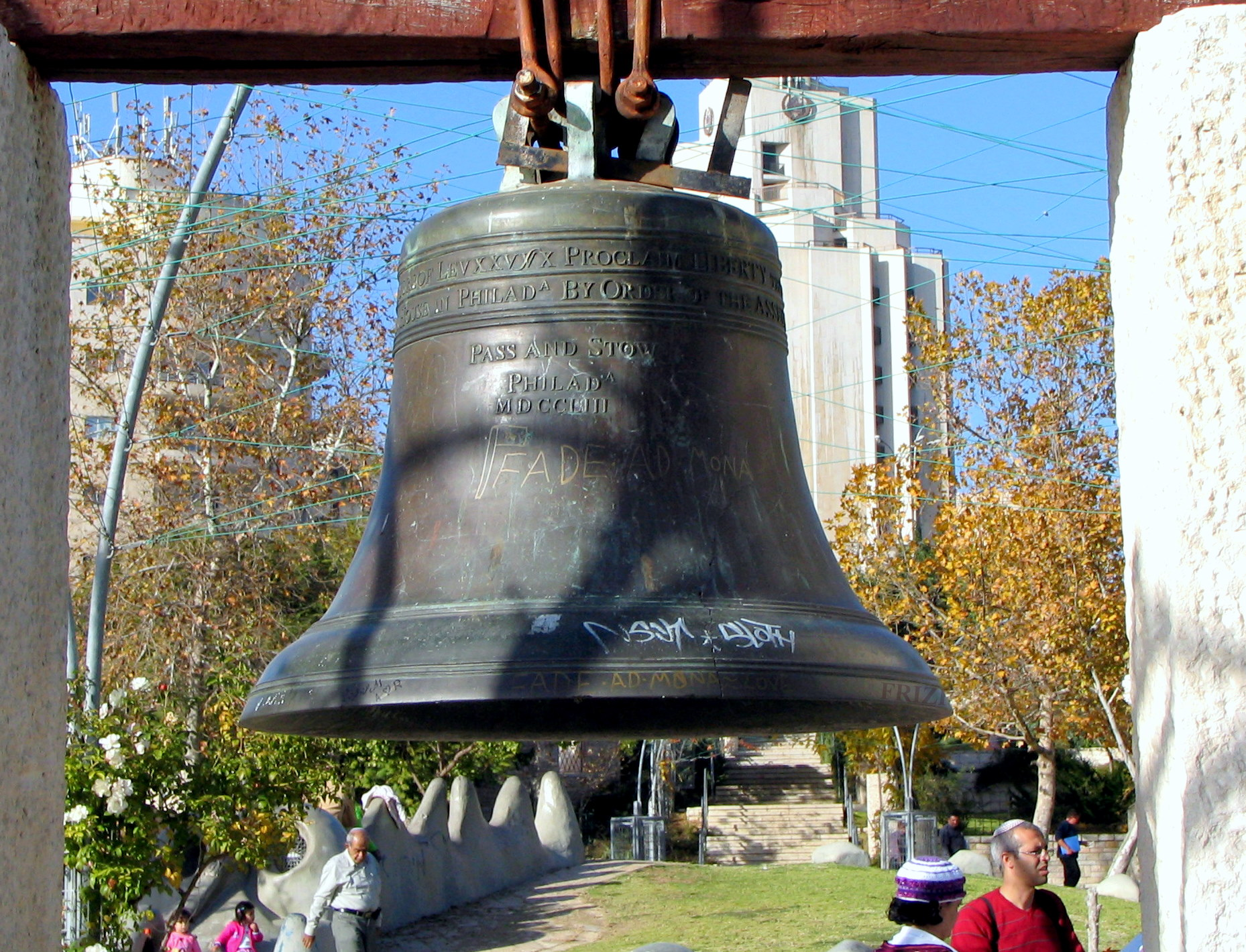
The replica bell in Liberty Bell Park.

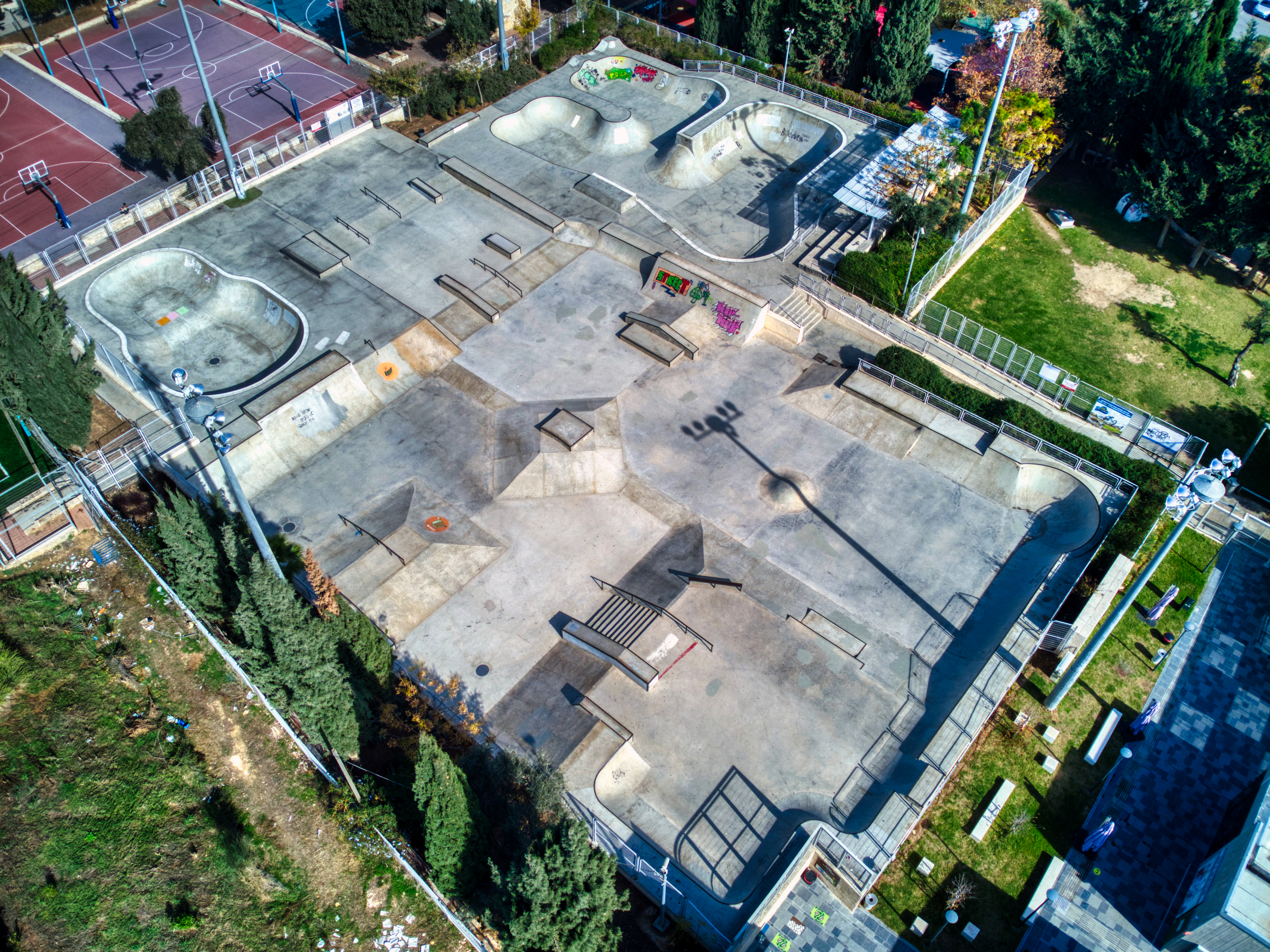
Gan Paamon HaDeror Skatepark

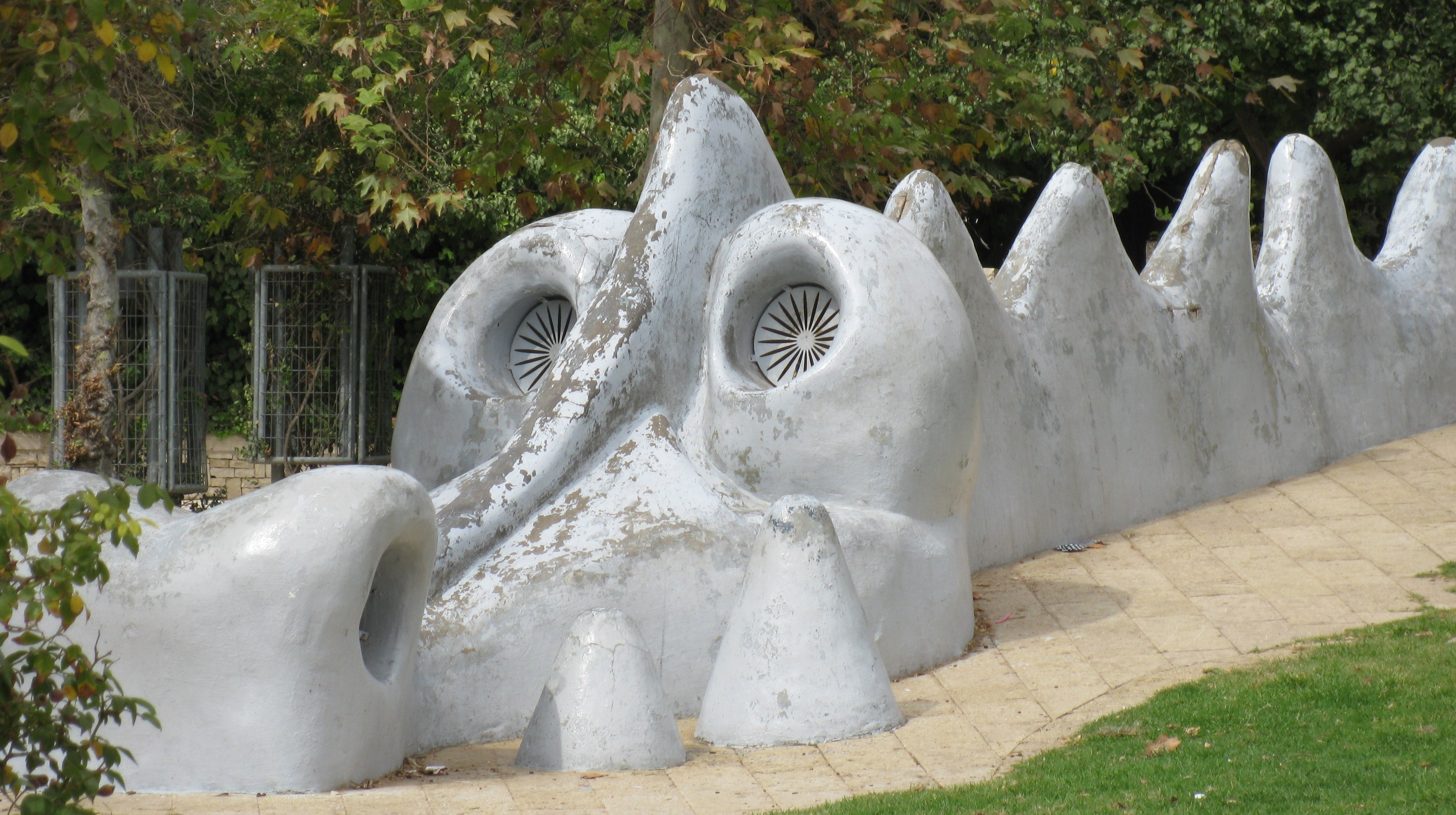
Jerry the Dragon

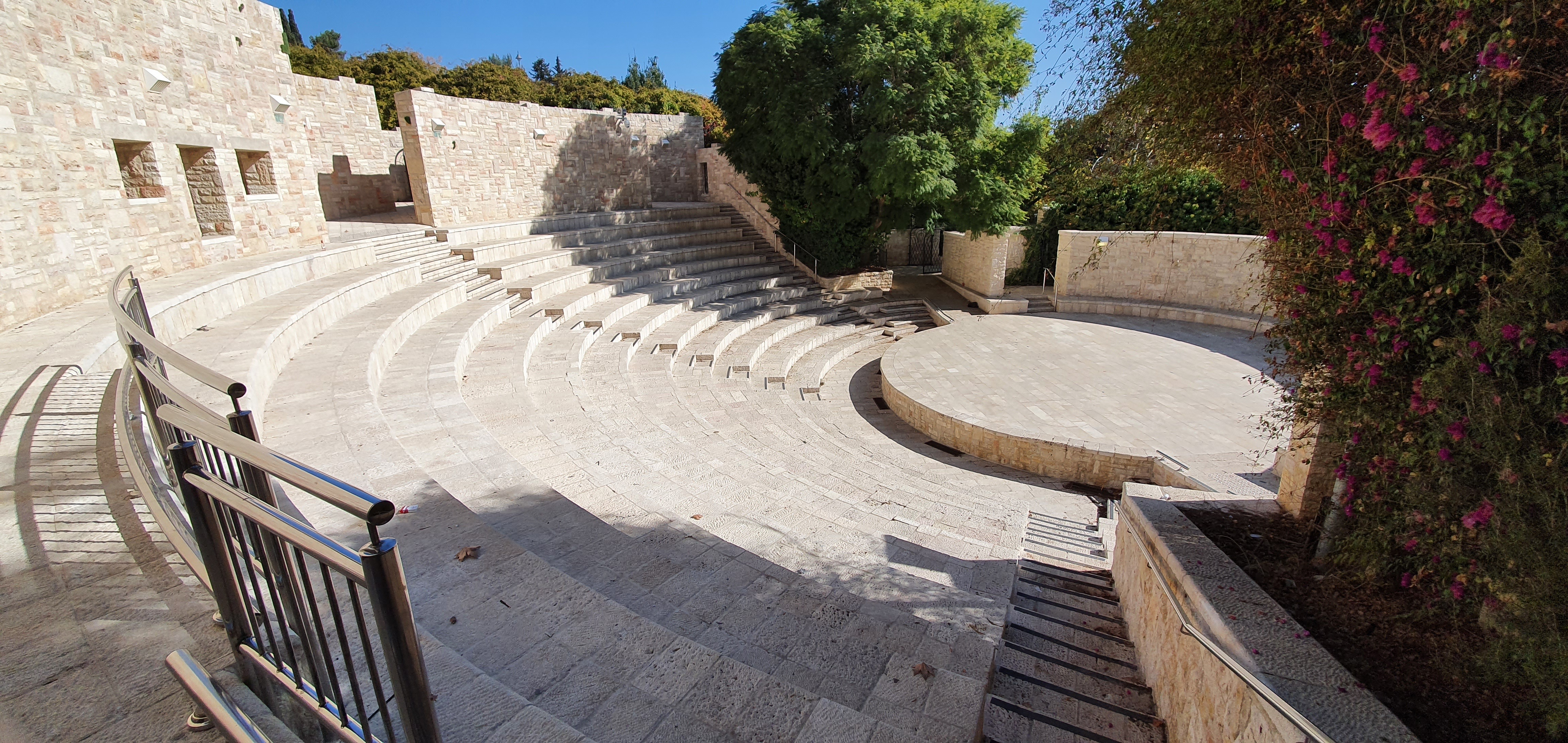
A small open theater in the Park

Liberty Bell Park (Hebrew: גן פעמון הדרור, Gan Pa'amon HaDror), is a park in Jerusalem containing a replica of the Liberty Bell from which it gets its name. It is located near the Talbiyeh, German Colony, and Yemin Moshe neighborhoods.

== History ==
Founded in 1976 to celebrate the USA's bicentennial and covering 9 acres, it is the most popular park in the city. It includes sports facilities, a picnic area, a 1,000-seat amphitheater, a music corner and areas for exhibitions, folk dancing and performances.

== Sites ==
The park features Jerry the Dragon, a concrete play sculpture by Ulrik Plesner, the Danish-born Israeli architect who designed the park.

The Train Theater, a children's puppet theater, is housed in an old railway carriage at the northern end of Liberty Bell Park.

== See also ==
- Liberty Bell Park bus bombing
- Tourism in Israel
