= Runners Without Borders =

Israeli NGO bringing together Jews and Arabs through running

- Formation: 2014; 12 years ago
- Founded at: Israel
- Purpose: Reducing racism and tension in Jerusalem through running
- Headquarters: Jerusalem, Israel
- Key people: Israel Haas, Shoshana Ben-David

Runners Without Borders is a non-profit organisation which brings together Jews and Arabs in Jerusalem through the sport of running. The organisation was founded in 2014 in response to violence in Jerusalem at the time. It aims to reduce racism and tension in the city.

Runners Without Borders groups, composed of Jews and Arabs, meet for joint training sessions on a weekly basis. In addition to the training sessions, the groups take part in a social activity once per month. Delegations from Runners Without Borders youth teams have attended international races in Europe, and represented Jerusalem as a team in Milan (April 2015), Berlin (August 2015), and London (September 2016). Additionally, Runners Without Borders' teams have participated in the Jerusalem Marathon every year since it was founded.

== History ==
The initiative started as a collaboration between Israel Haas, a resident of Jerusalem, and Shoshana Ben-David, a Jerusalem-based high school student. Runners Without Borders initially created a joined running team for Jewish and Arab girls between the ages of 14 and 19, who came from a wide range of neighbourhoods in east and west Jerusalem. In light of the girls’ group's success, a parallel boys’ group was founded, followed by Arab-Jewish running groups for men and women above the age of 20.

In June 2015 Runners Without Borders’ youth groups planned to attend the Jerusalem Municipality's night run, but were forced to cancel their participation when they discovered that the race was scheduled to take place during the first night of Ramadan. In response, Runners Without Borders created its own race.

The first Jewish-Arab race put on by Runners Without Borders took place between Beit Safafa and Malha (in south-west Jerusalem), with 87 participants. They produced two additional races along this route, and in March 2017 launched the first ever Jewish-Arab race in east Jerusalem, which took place between the Arab neighbourhoods of Abu Tor and Jabel Mukaber. Since then Runners Without Borders have produced three races in East Jerusalem, with over 700 runners in the November 2017 race.
