= Mekor Chaim =

Neighborhood in southwest Jerusalem

Mekor Chaim מקור חיים
- Neighborhood
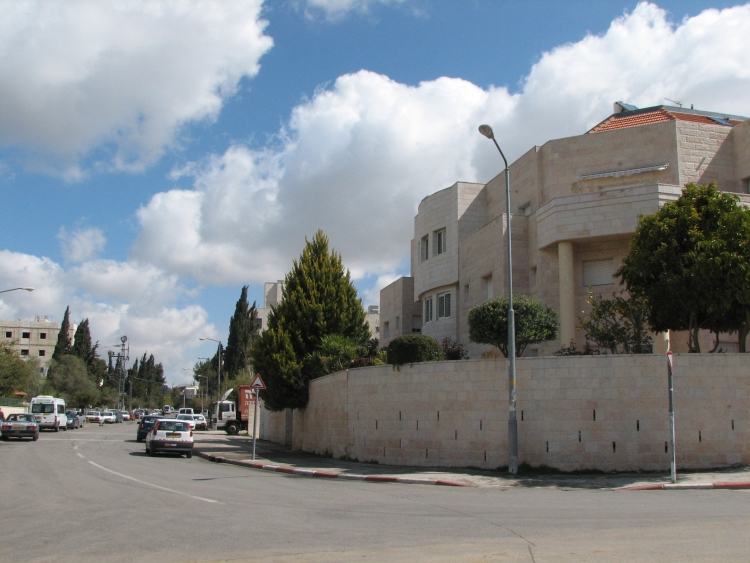
- Mekor Chaim Street, Jerusalem

- Location in Jerusalem
- City: Jerusalem
- Established: 1926
- Founder: Mizrahi movement

Area
  - Total: 12 ha (30 acres)

Mekor Chaim (also Makor Haim, Hebrew: מקור חיים, lit. Source of life) is a neighborhood in southwest Jerusalem. It was named for Haim Cohen, a wealthy Jewish businessman who donated large sums of money toward the purchase of land in Jerusalem before World War I.

== History ==
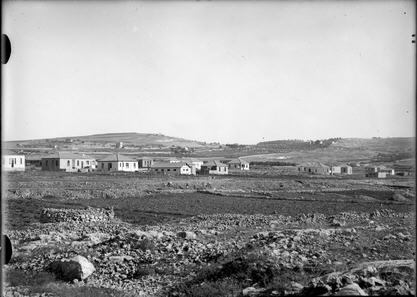
Mekor Haim 1926

The funds donated to Hovevei Zion by Haim Cohen were transferred to the Jewish National Fund, which purchased 120 dunams (0.12 km^{2}; 0.046 sq mi) of land on the southern fringes of Jerusalem. Mekor Chaim was established in 1926 by the religious Zionist Mizrahi movement. It was planned as a village of 20 small farmsteads, and was built along one main street which developed parallel to the railway line. Each family received a two-dunam plot for a house, garden and orchard. In the early days, the families had cow sheds and chicken coops. The building contractor, Mar Haim, was head of the first neighborhood committee. He arranged for the Hamekasher bus company to open a regular route between Mekor Chaim and the city center. Initially, there was one central water tap in the south of the neighborhood. The committee purchased the water from the municipality and placed a watchman at the tap to count how many buckets each family drew. Later, raised water cisterns were built in the garden of each home. During the Arab riots of 1929, the residents took shelter in the synagogue, which was built like a fortress.

According to a census conducted in 1931 by the British Mandate authorities, Mekor Chaim had a population of 202 inhabitants, in 41 houses.

Located between the Arab villages of Malha and Beit Safafa, and far from other Jewish neighborhoods, Mekor Chaim was exposed to Arab sniping and endured a lengthy siege that began in December 1947. Convoys of supplies from Talpiot to Mekor Chaim were turned back by the British Army. In the 1948 war, the Haganah was stationed there and it was the site of fierce battles, facing an Arab siege that was exacerbated by the neighborhood's isolation. A monument to the 12 defenders killed during the 1948 War of Independence was constructed in the 1990s outside the community's original synagogue.

After the Six-Day War, the Talpiot industrial zone was developed, ending the neighborhood's isolation. In the mid-1980s, the Jerusalem city council established zoning laws to stop the encroachment of commerce and preserve the residential character of Mekor Chaim. The Israel State Archives was located in the neighbourhood, but was forced to move after it was discovered that the building didn't have an occupancy permit.

== Education ==
The Sudbury Democratic School is located in Mekor Chaim.

== Archaeology ==
During road construction at Mekor Chaim in the 1970s, archaeologists uncovered a sealed, rock-cut, single-chamber tomb that had remained undisturbed for roughly two millennia. The tomb contained more than twenty-five burials. A coin of the Roman emperor Domitian suggests that the tomb remained in use, or was at least revisited, as late as 80/81 CE, during the inter-revolt period between the First Jewish–Roman War and the Bar Kokhba Revolt, and after the destruction of Jerusalem in 70 CE.

Among the finds was an inscribed ossuary bearing the words מרים אמה, Hebrew for "Mother Miriam", which contained the bones of a 65-year-old woman.
