= Emek Refaim =

Notable street in the Germany Colony district of Jerusalem

Coordinates: 31°45′47.53″N 35°13′8.84″E

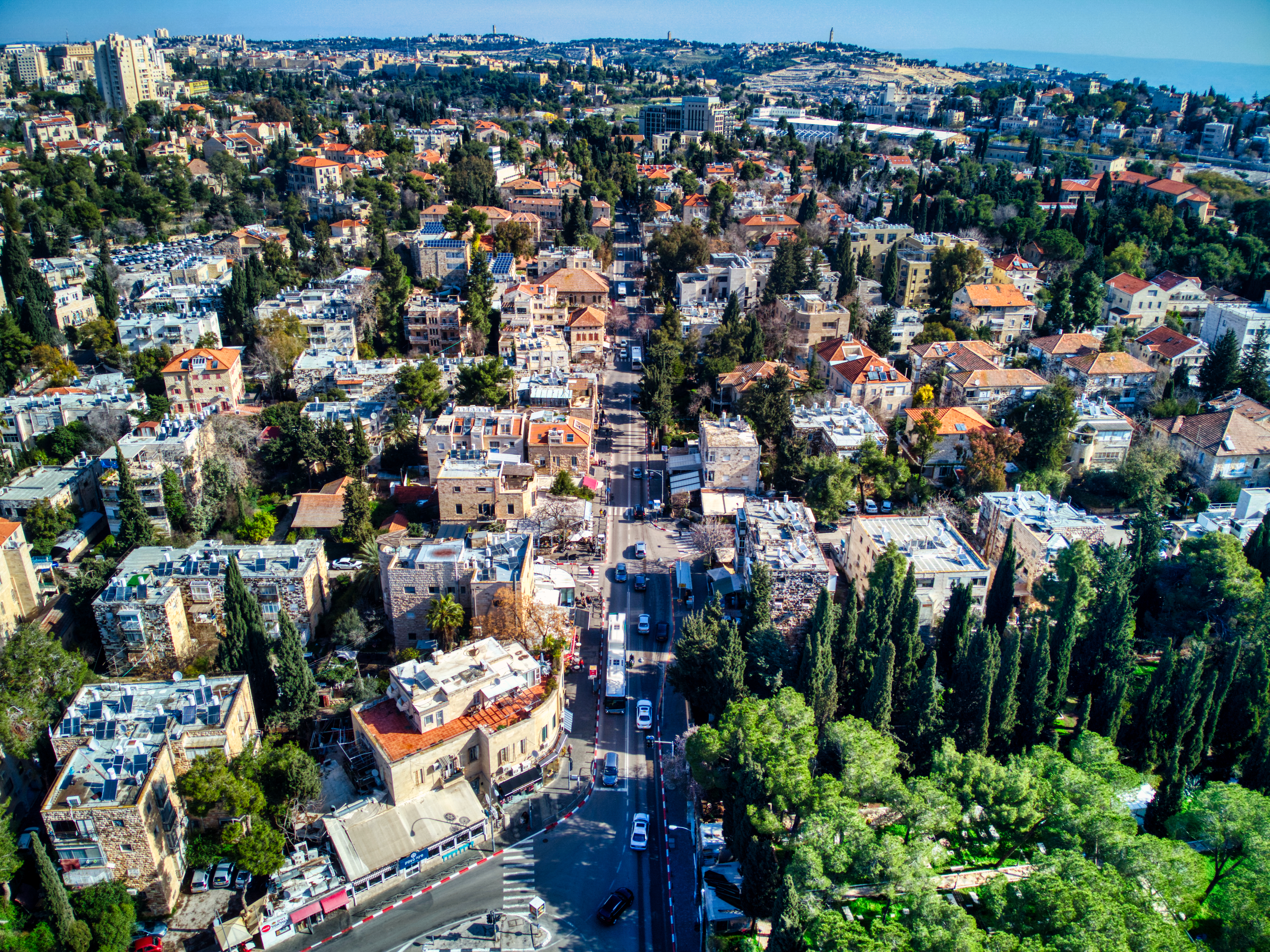
Emek Refaim street, Jerusalem

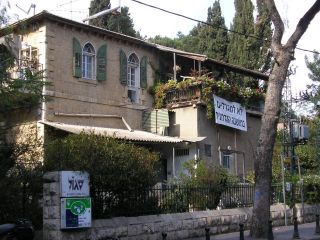
Historic Templer house on Emek Refaim

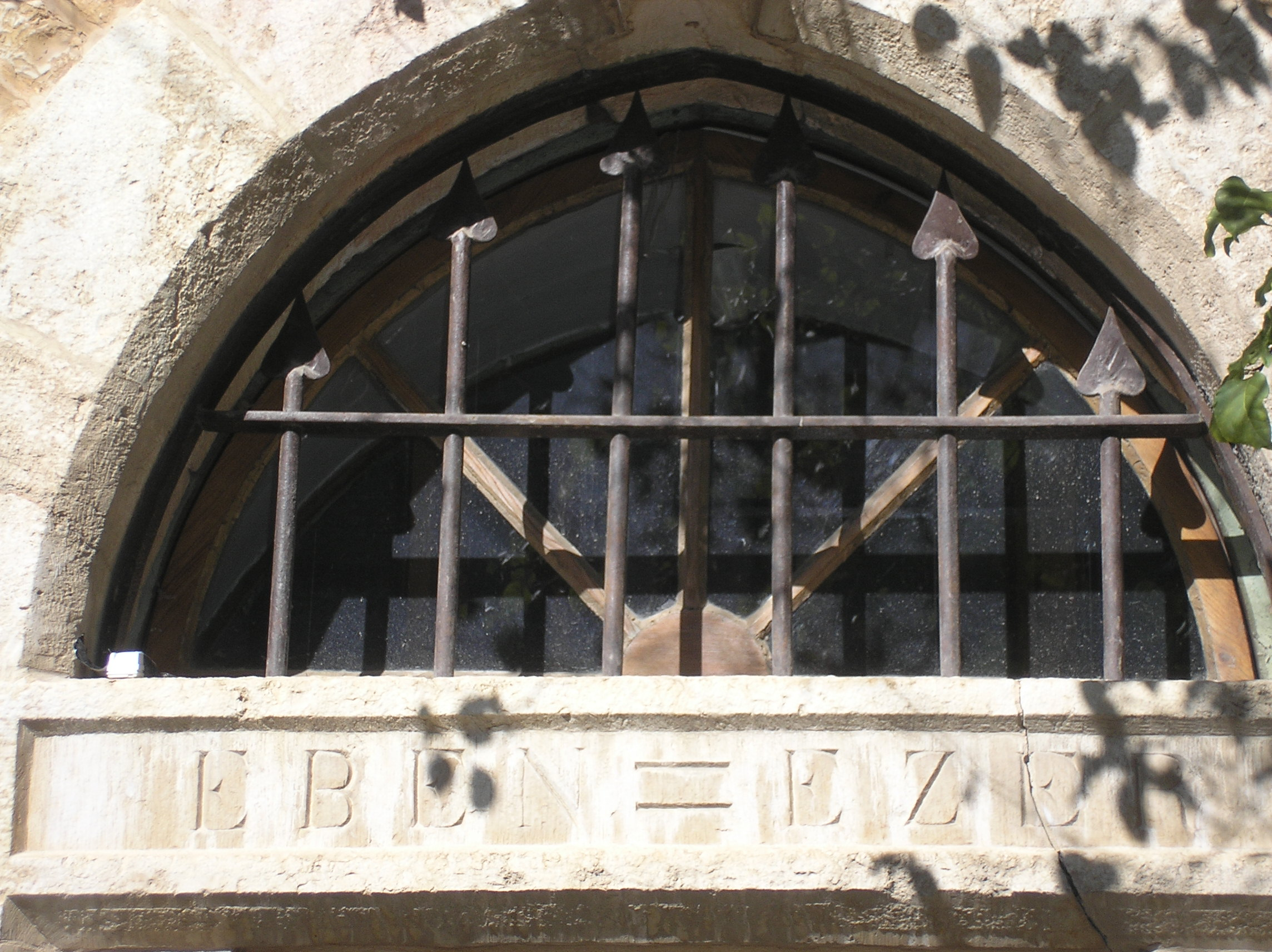
Inscription: Eben-Ezer on the Matthäus Frank House

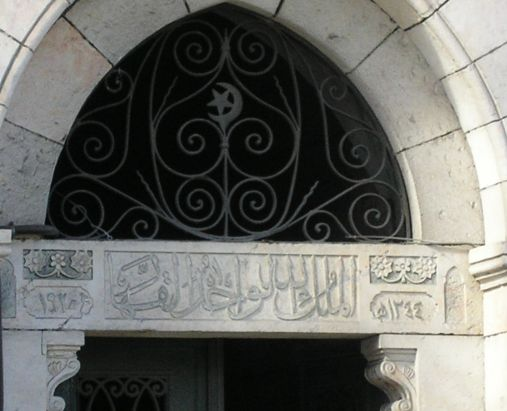
Arabic inscription on lintel dated to 1925/1344 A.H

Emek Refaim (Hebrew: עמק רפאים, English: Valley of Ghosts) is the German Colony, a neighborhood in Jerusalem, as well as its main street. It takes its name from the biblical Valley of Rephaim which began its descent from Jerusalem here.

== Etymology ==
Emek Refa’im can be translated as either "the valley of the ghosts" or "the valley of the giants". The 2nd-century CE Aramaic Targum of Onkelos translates the words as meshar gibaraya, or "plain of the mighty". Jerome’s 4th-century Latin Vulgate translates the phrase as "vallis Raphaim", and the English King James Version follows the Jewish commentators, translating it as "the valley of the giants".

== History ==
Outside of the ancient city of Jerusalem, but inhabited by villagers from the tribe of Judah in the first and second Temple periods.

The first residents of Emek Refaim in modern times were German Templers, who settled there in the 19th century. Biblical inscriptions in German Fraktur script can still be seen on the lintels of some of the homes. As enemy aliens, the Templers were interned and later deported by the British during World War II. They built one- and two-storey houses similar in appearance to the homes they left in Württemberg.

== Architecture ==
Many of the buildings on Emek Refaim date from Ottoman and British Mandate times. Some of the distinctive German Templer buildings are still standing, as are elegant villas that belonged to wealthy Arabs before the establishment of the State of Israel.

Some homes in the area were abandoned by local Arabs or expropriated after 1948, and many issues of property ownership and displacement have yet to be resolved. A former Arab resident of the Bäuerle House, located at 10 Emek Refaim (originally built by the Templers), wrote about a painful visit to her home after 1967.

At the corner of Emek Refaim, on a hill overlooking the Hinnom Valley, is the Scottish Church of St. Andrew's, built in 1927 and incorporating local Armenian tile-work. Similar tiling can be seen on the facades of some buildings on Emek Refaim.

The residents of Emek Refaim have banded together to protest plans to build a hotel and residential towers in the area, which would affect the historic character of the neighborhood. The protest was partially successful, in that the small grove next to the building will be preserved, and the planned height of the hotel was reduced from the original 14 to 7 floors - making it - The Orient Hotel by Dan Hotels, the largest and tallest structure on Emek Refaim.

== Transportation ==
As of 2016, planners for the Jerusalem Light Rail network have announced the possibility that a rail line will pass along Emek Refaim, which will be closed to traffic in both directions. This sparked another wave of protests, which have in turn prompted a public debate on alternative routes that would leave the street as-is. Construction is beginning on 7 July 2025.

== Landmarks ==
The Smadar movie theater was built in 1928. It was German-owned and mainly served the British Army. In 1935, it opened for commercial screenings as the "Orient Cinema". It was turned over to Jewish management to keep it from being boycotted as a German business, infuriating the head of the Nazi Party branch in Jerusalem. After 1948, it was bought by four demobilized soldiers, one of them Arye Chechik, who bought out his partners in 1950. According to a journalist who lived next door, Chechik sold the tickets, ran to collect them at the door and worked as the projectionist. His wife ran the concession stand.

== Notable residents ==
- Ehud Olmert

== See also ==
- German Colony, Jerusalem
