= Highway 16 (Israel) =

Highway in Israel

Coordinates: 31°46′44″N 35°10′51″E

Highway 16
- כביש 16
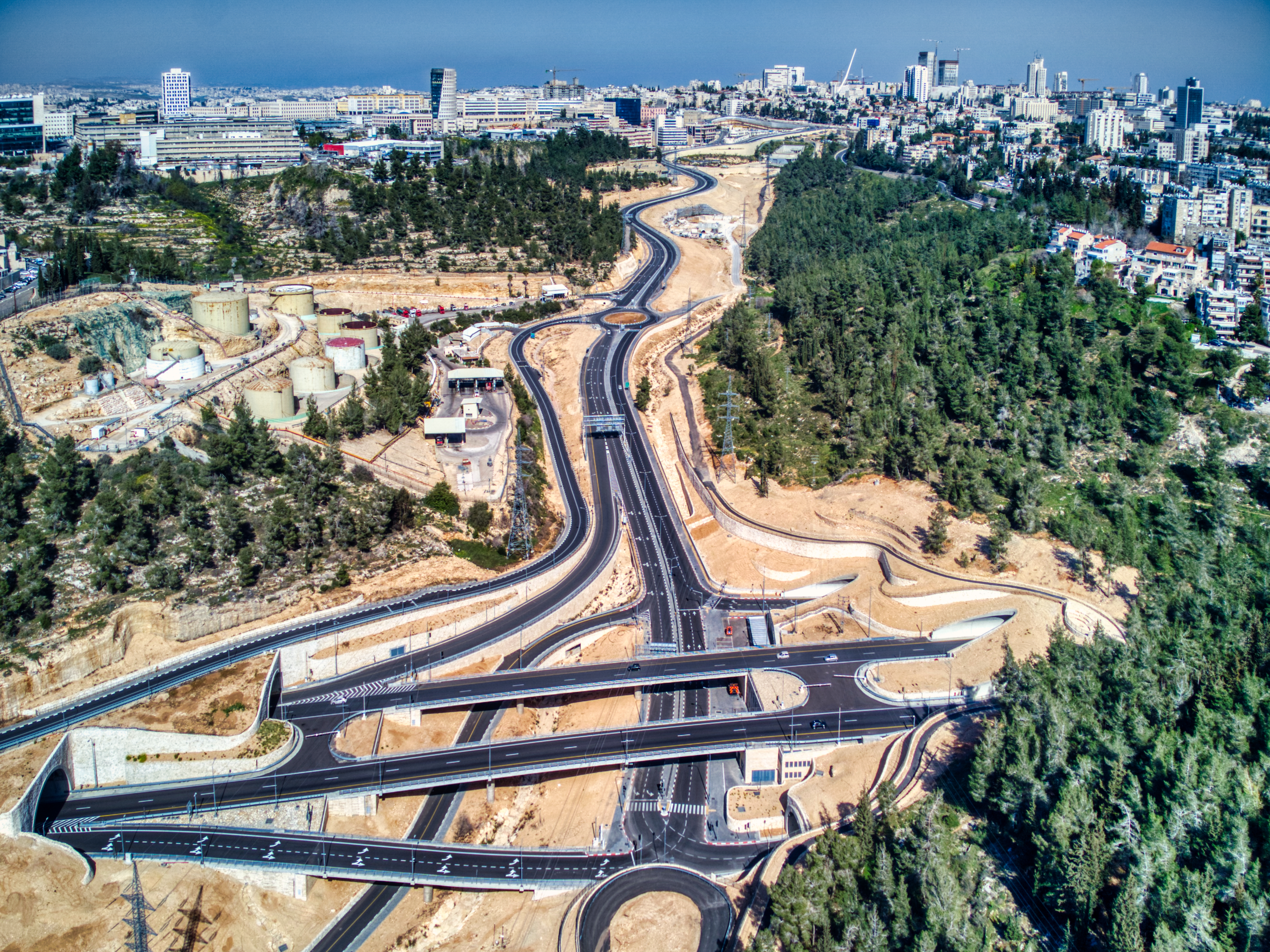
- Nahal Revida Interchange

Route information
- Length: 5.26 km (3.27 mi)
- Existed: 2022–present

Major junctions
- West end: Motza Interchange
- Nahal Revida Interchange; Beyth Interchange
- East end: Givat Mordechai

Location
- Country: Israel

Highway system
- Roads in Israel; Highways
← Highway 13	→ Highway 20

Highway 16 (or Ariel Sharon Blvd) is a highway at the western entrance to Jerusalem providing direct access to the southern and central sections of the city from the west. Most of the road is located inside newly built tunnels. The project cost approximately 1.5 billion shekels, and was inaugurated a year ahead of schedule on August 31, 2022.

== Highway ==
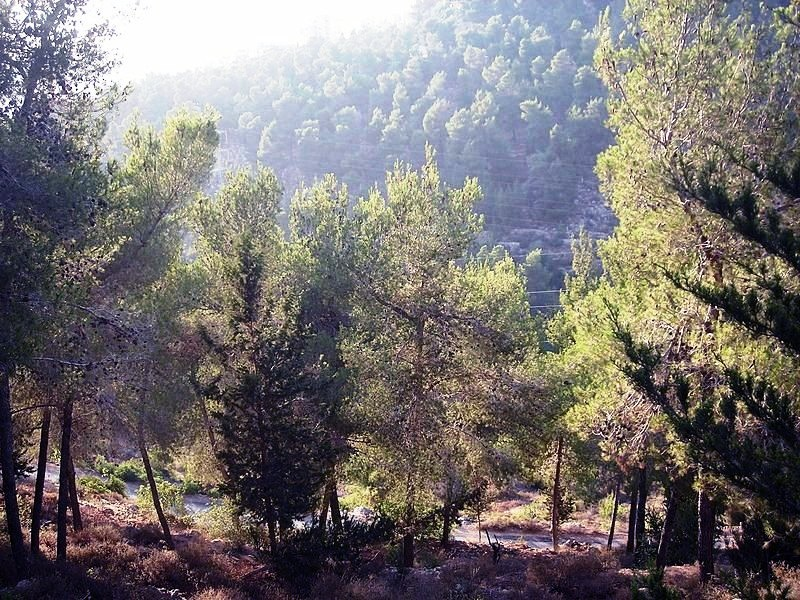
View west across Nahal Revida Valley Site of the future Nahal Revida Interchange

The highway connects Highway 1 at the new Motza Interchange and Jerusalem's Highway 50 (Begin Boulevard) at Givat Mordechai Interchange. The road mostly travels through a series of tunnels under the west Jerusalem neighbourhoods of Har Nof and Yefeh Nof and the parking lots of Shaare Zedek Medical Center. In the center, an above-ground interchange was built in the valley of Nahal Revida (Revida Stream) adjacent to the Pi Glilot Fuel Terminal to connect to Derech Yosef Weitz leading to Givat Shaul. The road was constructed as a four-lane freeway with a speed limit of 80 km/h.

== History ==
The road was first proposed in the 1990s. Initially, the road was supposed to skirt around the western and southern slopes of Har Nof before entering a tunnel at Nahal Revida, continuing eastward under Yefeh Nof. This would have created nearly a kilometre of fully open road through the Jerusalem Forest. This plan was met with stiff opposition by the Jewish National Fund and a variety of "Green" groups due to ecological damage to the forest. As a result, the plan was changed to include a tunnel under Har Nof with an intermediate above-ground interchange at Nahal Revida.

The program was stopped in 2003 to conduct environmental studies and consider an alternative to the Nahal Revida Interchange. By the end of 2007, the National Infrastructure Committee adopted the plan pending clarifications and public review. The plan moved forward again with an indemnity agreement between the Jerusalem Municipality and the Israel Ministry of Transport in 2010. At the same time, responsibility for building the road was shifted from the Moriah Jerusalem Development Corporation to the National Roads Company of Israel. Economic and environmental studies were updated. A plan to build the road as one long tunnel with the Nahal Ravida Interchange underground was rejected for economic reasons and because of the need for massive ventilation facilities that would cause greater environmental damage to the forest.

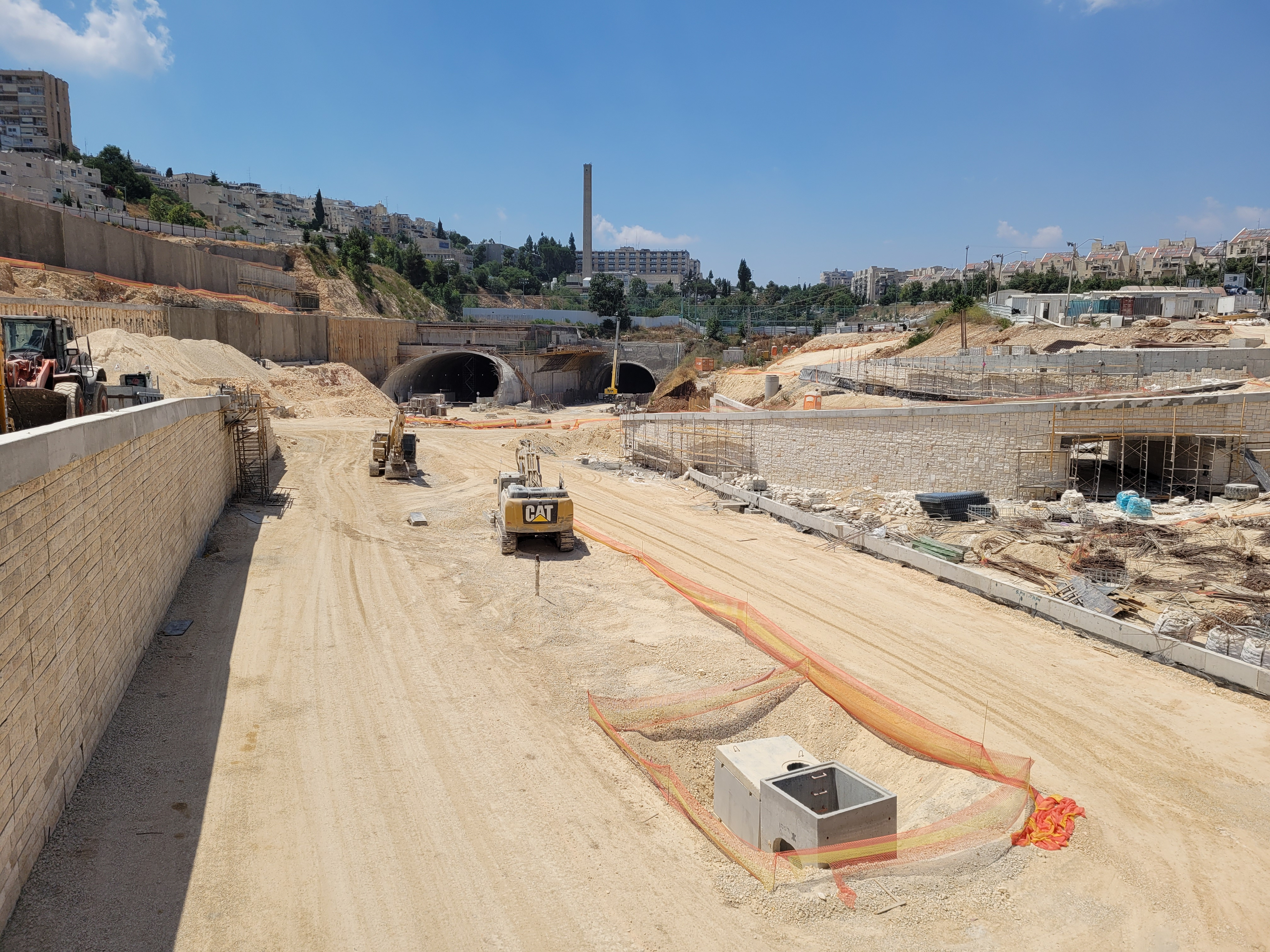
Construction works for the Yefe Nof tunnel and the Beyth intersection. In the background, left to right: Bayit VeGan neighborhood, Shaare Zedek hospital, Ramat Beit Hakerem neighborhood

The plan was approved in 2011, again with further delays pending public review. According to the National Roads Company, the plan was approved and budgeted at the end of 2012. After many delays, the construction contract was finally awarded in August 2018, with construction expected to begin in 2019 and last through 2023.

Following the death of Talmudic scholar and former Sephardi Chief Rabbi of Israel Ovadia Yosef in 2013, Israeli Minister of Transport Yisrael Katz announced that the road would be named in his honour. However, the Jerusalem Municipality Names Committee, which has jurisdiction in the matter, declared in 2017 that the road would be named in honour of former Israeli Prime Minister, Ariel Sharon.

== Construction accident ==
On June 7, 2021, a portion of the Shaare Zedek hospital's external parking lot collapsed. Seven parked cars fell into the sinkhole, which was deep enough to "swallow" a whole palm tree vertically, as well. There were no reported victims, either killed or wounded. A cave or space between the ground and the excavated tunnel seems to be the sinkhole's cause. Later, in August, Netivei Israel's spokesman said "We are exercising responsibility by repairing the hole," adding "responsibility is not guilt" because "there is also a separate issue regarding water from the Gihon water company that had permeated the ground due to insufficient drainage. It is also possible that we will never know the cause.".

== Criticism ==
Critics of the project note that because the road currently ends at a traffic light, it creates heavy congestion inside the city. To partially overcome this, a set of tunnels that will enable a more direct connection to Begin highway are expected to be completed in the late-2020s. Other criticisms include the project's immense budget, which could have instead been used to advance public transportation. Building of the project significantly disrupted the Motza and Revida valleys' natural habitat, including a large pre-historic archeological site, which was discovered and subsequently reburied.

== Interchanges (West to East) ==
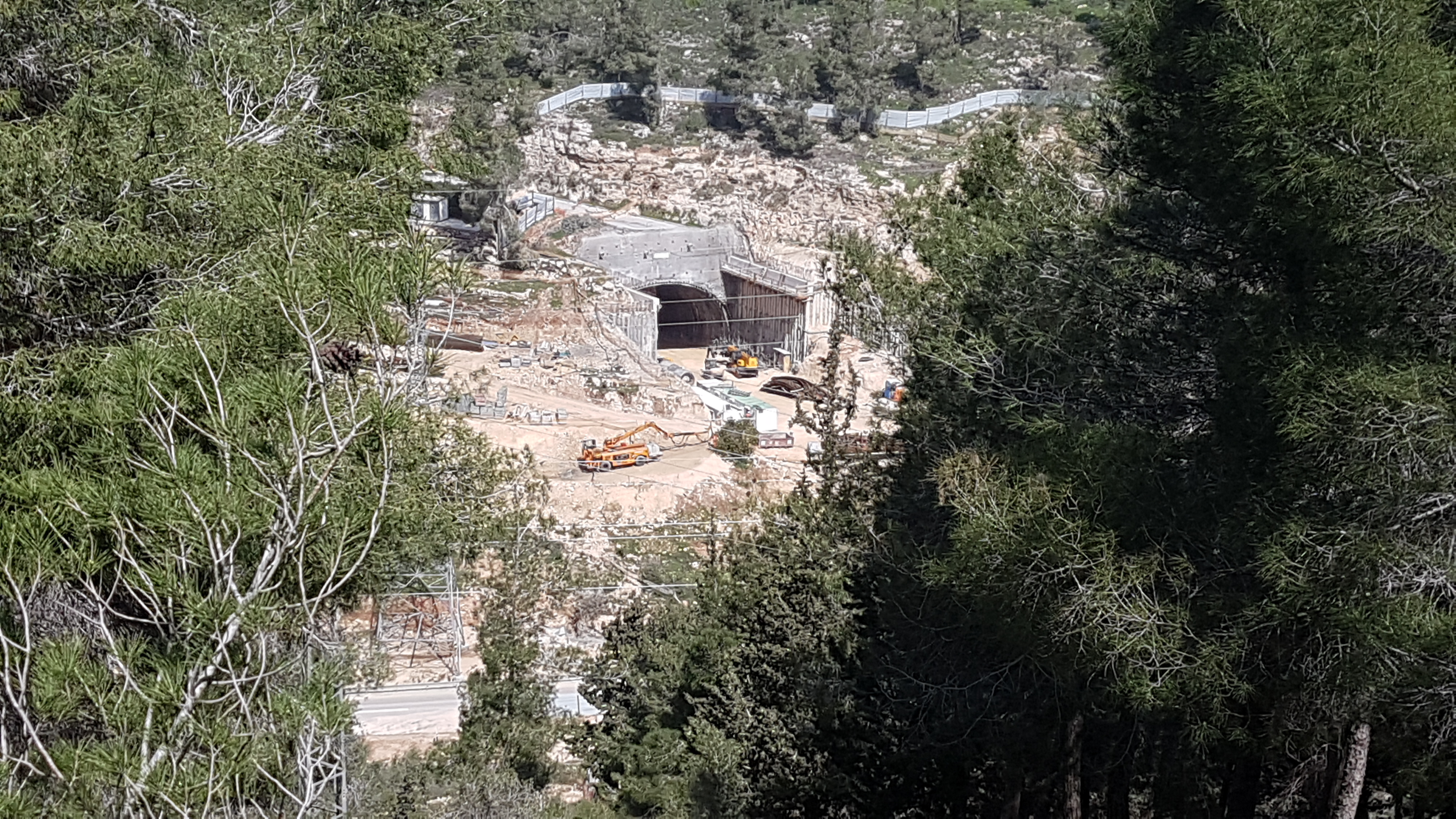
Construction works for the Har Nof tunnel, photograph taken from Jerusalem Forest

District	Location	km	mi	Name	Destinations	Notes
Jerusalem	Motza	0.00	0.00	מחלף מוצא (Motza Interchange)	Highway 1	
Jerusalem	Har Nof	1.32	0.82	מנהרת הר נוף (Har Nof Tunnel)		4 lanes, 1.5 km
Jerusalem	Givat Shaul	2.90	1.80	מחלף נחל רבידה (Nahal Revida Interchange)	Derech Yosef Weitz.	
Jerusalem	Yefeh Nof	3.02	1.88	מנהרת בית הכרם (Beit HaKerem Tunnel)		4 lanes, 1.3 km
Jerusalem	Ramat Beit HaKerem	4.53	2.81	מחלף בייט (Beyth Interchange)	Shmuel Beyth St.	named after Hans Beyth
Jerusalem	Givat Mordechai	5.26	3.27	מחלף גבעת מרדכי (Givat Mordechai Interchange)	Highway 50; Bezalel Bazak Street	
1.000 mi = 1.609 km; 1.000 km = 0.621 mi
