= Route 386 (Israel) =

Route in Israel

Coordinates: 31°46′17.80″N 35°09′06.20″E

Route 386
- כביש 386
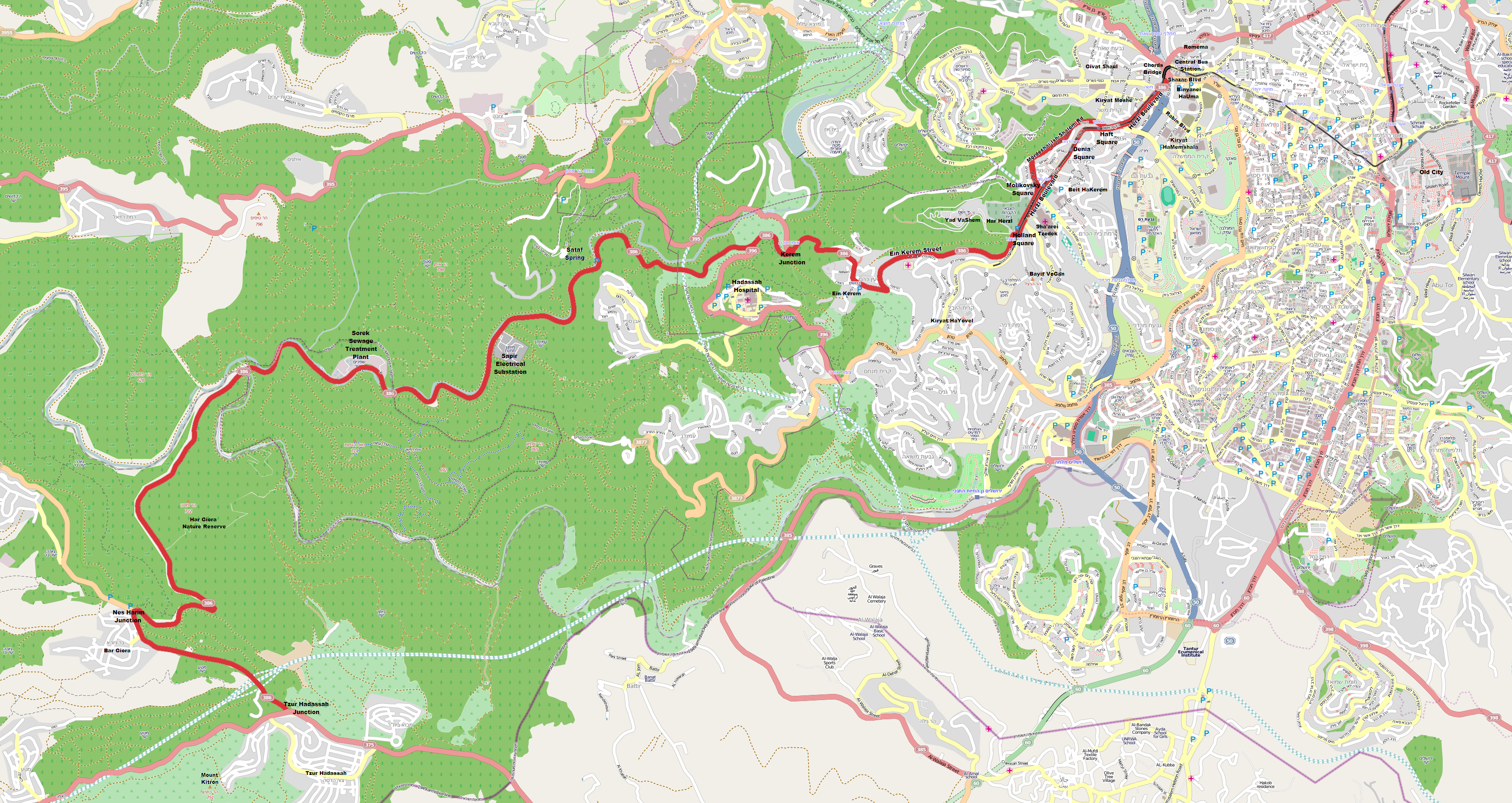

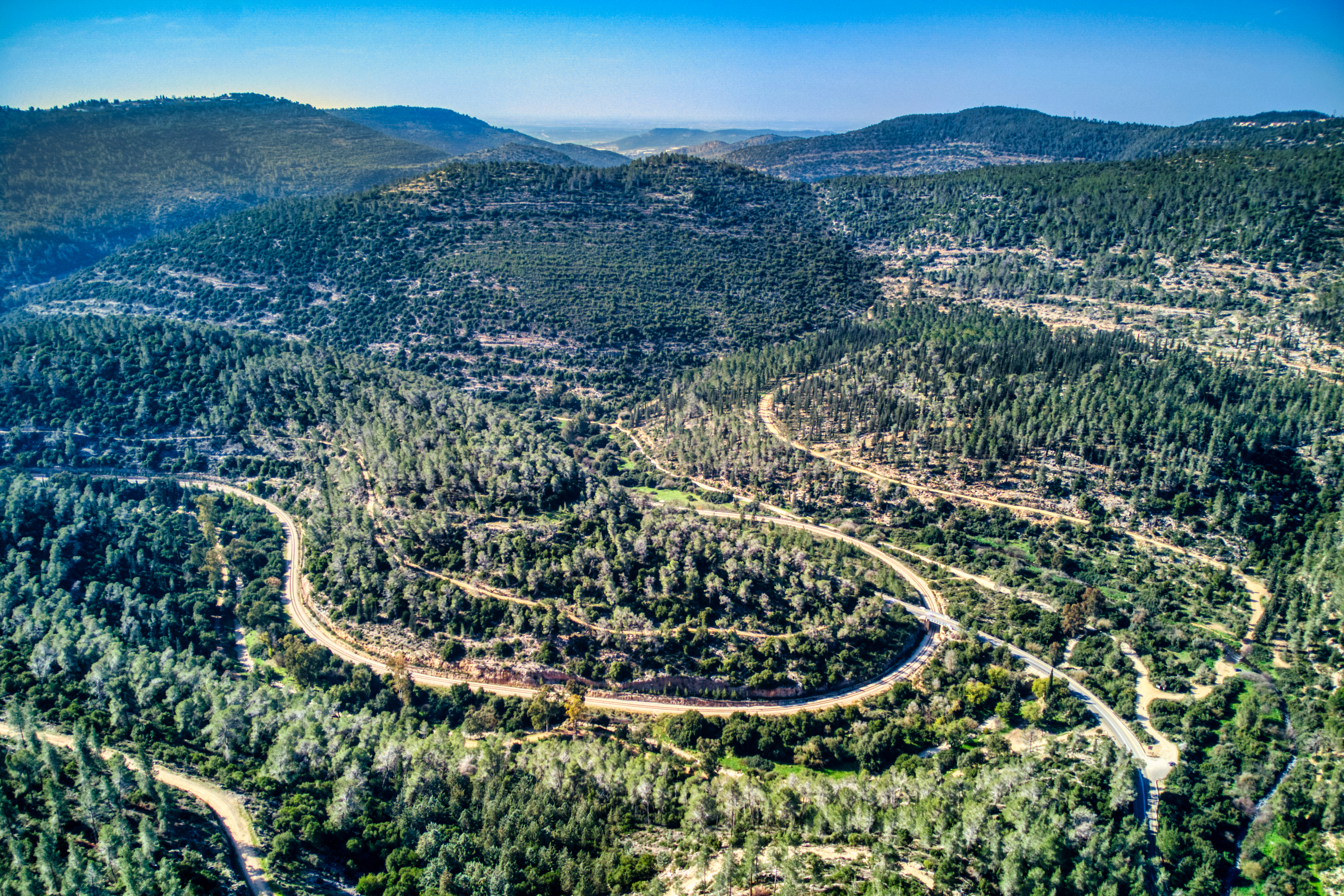
- Refaim Bridge, at which the Jaffa–Jerusalem railway is passing below road 386, at the point Nahal Refaim is entering Nahal Sorek

Route information
- Length: 23 km (14 mi)

Major junctions
- South end: Tzur Hadassah Junction
- Nes Harim Junction; Kerem Junction; Holland Square; Mileikowsky Square; Zalman Mart Square; Haft Square
- North end: Chords Bridge

Location
- Country: Israel

Highway system
- Roads in Israel; Highways
← Route 383	→ Route 395

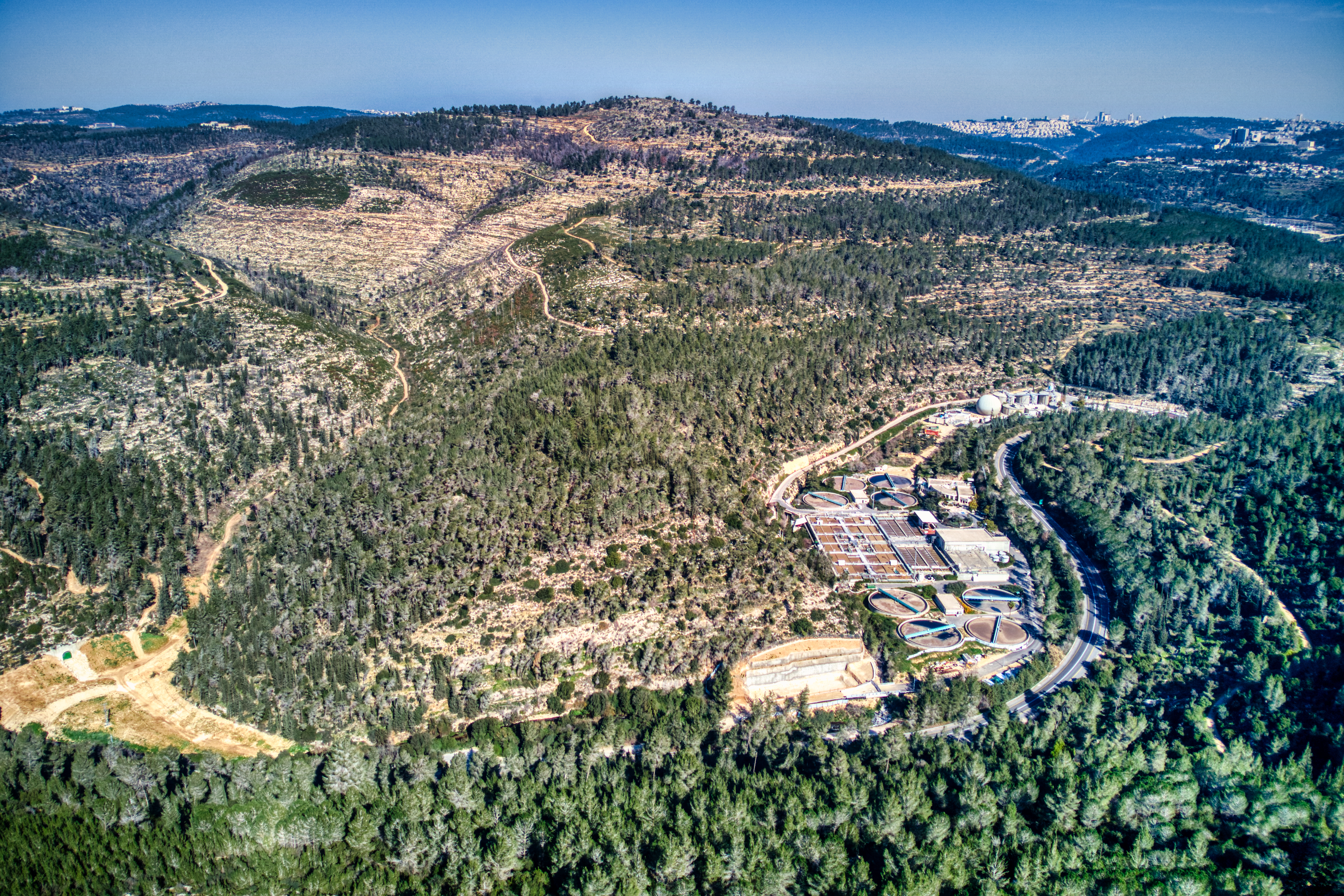
Sorek Wastewater Treatment Plant in Nahal Sorek, near Road 386 and beside Mount Eitan

Route 386 is a road in Israel that runs from Tzur Hadassah to Jerusalem.

== Route ==
The route begins as a two-lane undivided road in the Judean Mountains at 730 meters above sea level at Tzur Hadassah Junction with Route 375. It travels west-northwest for 2 km. passing Moshav Bar Giora and Nes Harim Junction with Road 3866 where it turns eastward for 1.2 km. and negotiates a hairpin turn. The road then begins a long winding descent, first west, then north, then east, skirting around the west side of the Har Giora Nature Reserve offering scenic views as it descends into the Sorek Valley. At its lowest point of 550 meters, the road passes Jerusalem's largest sewage treatment facility (Sorek).

It then begins a slow northeasterly ascent as it passes Jerusalem's main electrical substation (Sapir Station) and the Sataf Spring Nature Reserve. Turning more easterly, it enters Jerusalem just before passing below Hadassah Hospital, intersecting with Route 395 at Kerem Junction. It continues its ascent via Ein Kerem Street through the neighbourhood of Ein Kerem travelling southeast, then north, then east until Holland Square adjacent to the Bayit VeGan neighbourhood. From this point, Route 386 becomes a boulevard with traffic light-controlled intersections.

The road continues northeasterly as Sderot Herzl (Herzl Boulevard), also known as Tzir Herzl (Herzl Axis), the major north-south route on the west side of the city. Along this portion of the route, tracks were laid for the Jerusalem Light Rail, which began operation in August 2011. The road passes Yad Vashem, the Mount Herzl National Cemetery and Sha'arei Tzedek Medical Center. Between Mileikowsky Square at Shmuel Beyth Street and Haft Square at HeHalutz Street, northbound traffic may continue through Beit HaKerem along Herzl Boulevard. However, southbound traffic is shunted 0.2 km (0.12 mi) west along the parallel Mordechai Ish-Shalom Street.

After Haft Square, the road travels between the neighbourhoods of Kiryat Moshe and Kiryat HaLeom, passing near the Kiryat Moshe Interchange of Highway 50. It ends at 800 meters above sea level at Route 417 and Shazar Boulevard at the main western entrance to Jerusalem at the base of the Jerusalem Chords Bridge and the Binyanei HaUma Convention Center.

== Junctions (South to North) ==
District	Location	km	mi	Name	Destinations	Notes
Jerusalem	Tzur Hadassah	0	0.0	צומת צור הדסה (Tzur Hadassah Junction)	Route 375	
Jerusalem	Bar Giora	2	1.2	צומת בר גיורה (Bar Giora Junction)	Entrance to Bar Giora	
Jerusalem	Nes Harim	2.5	1.6	צומת נס הרים (Nes Harim Junction)	Road 3866	
Jerusalem	Hadassah Hospital	15.5	9.6	צומת כרם (Kerem Junction)	Route 396	
Jerusalem	Ein Kerem	16	9.9	צומת כרם (Kerem Junction)	Route 395	
Jerusalem	Ein Kerem	16.9	10.5	צומת ללא שם (Unnamed Junction)	Emek HaTeimanim St.	
Jerusalem	Ein Kerem	17.3	10.7	כיכר קסטל (Kastel Square)	HaHadasim St.	
Jerusalem	Ein Kerem	17.9	11.1	צומת ללא שם (Unnamed Junction)	Karmit Rd.	
Jerusalem	Ein Kerem	18.6	11.6	צומת ללא שם (Unnamed Junction)	Shaul Barkali St.	
Jerusalem	Mount Herzl	19.5	12.1	כיכר הולנד (Holland Square)	Kiryat HaYovel St.	
Jerusalem	Beit HaKerem	20	12	כיכר מיליקובסקי (Mileikowsky Square)	Shmuel Beyth St.	
Jerusalem	Yefeh Nof	20.5	12.7	כיכר זלמן מרט (Zalman Mart Square)	HaArazim St.	
Jerusalem	Kiryat Moshe	21.5	13.4	כיכר האפט (Haft Square)	HeHalutz St.	
Jerusalem	Kiryat HaLeom	22.5	14.0	צומת קריית משה (Kiryat Moshe Junction)	Kiryat Moshe St.	
Jerusalem	Kiryat HaLeom	22.7	14.1	צומת הרב צבי יהודה (HaRav Zvi Yehuda Junction)	HaRav Zvi Yehuda St.	
Jerusalem	Romema	23	14	גשר המיתרים (Chords Bridge)	Route 417; Shazar Boulevard	
1.000 mi = 1.609 km; 1.000 km = 0.621 mi
