= Jerusalem Forest =

Pine forest in the Judean Mountains

Coordinates: 31°46′30″N 35°10′0″E

The Jerusalem Forest in located in Israel. It is in Western Jerusalem recognized by the United Nations as Israeli sovereignty.

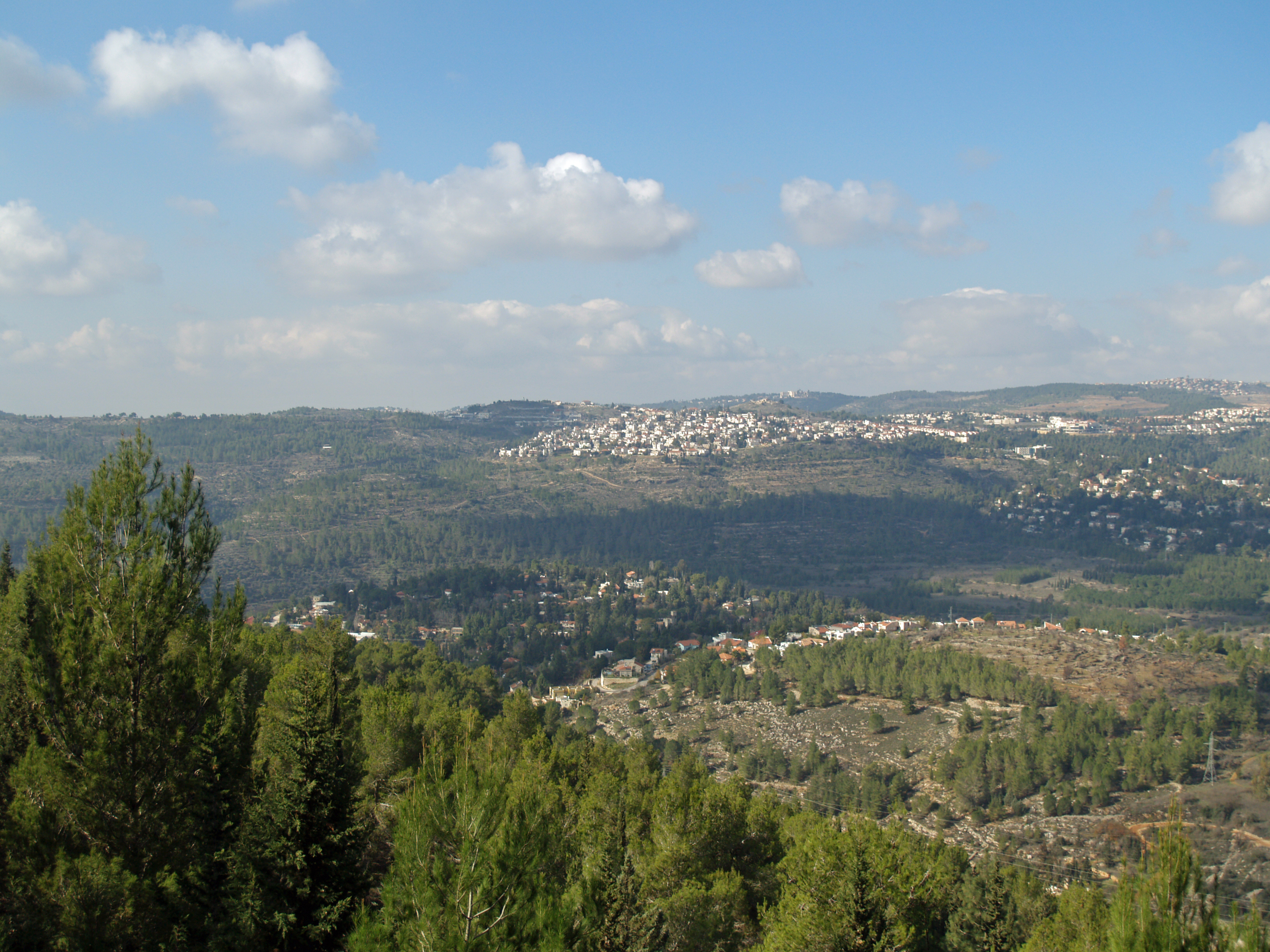
View of Jerusalem Forest from Yad Vashem

The Jerusalem Forest is a municipal pine forest located in the Judean Mountains on the outskirts of Jerusalem in Israel. It is surrounded by the neighborhoods of Beit HaKerem, Yefe Nof, Ein Kerem, Har Nof and Givat Shaul, and a moshav, Beit Zeit. The forest was planted during the 1950s by the Jewish National Fund, financed by private donors.

== History ==
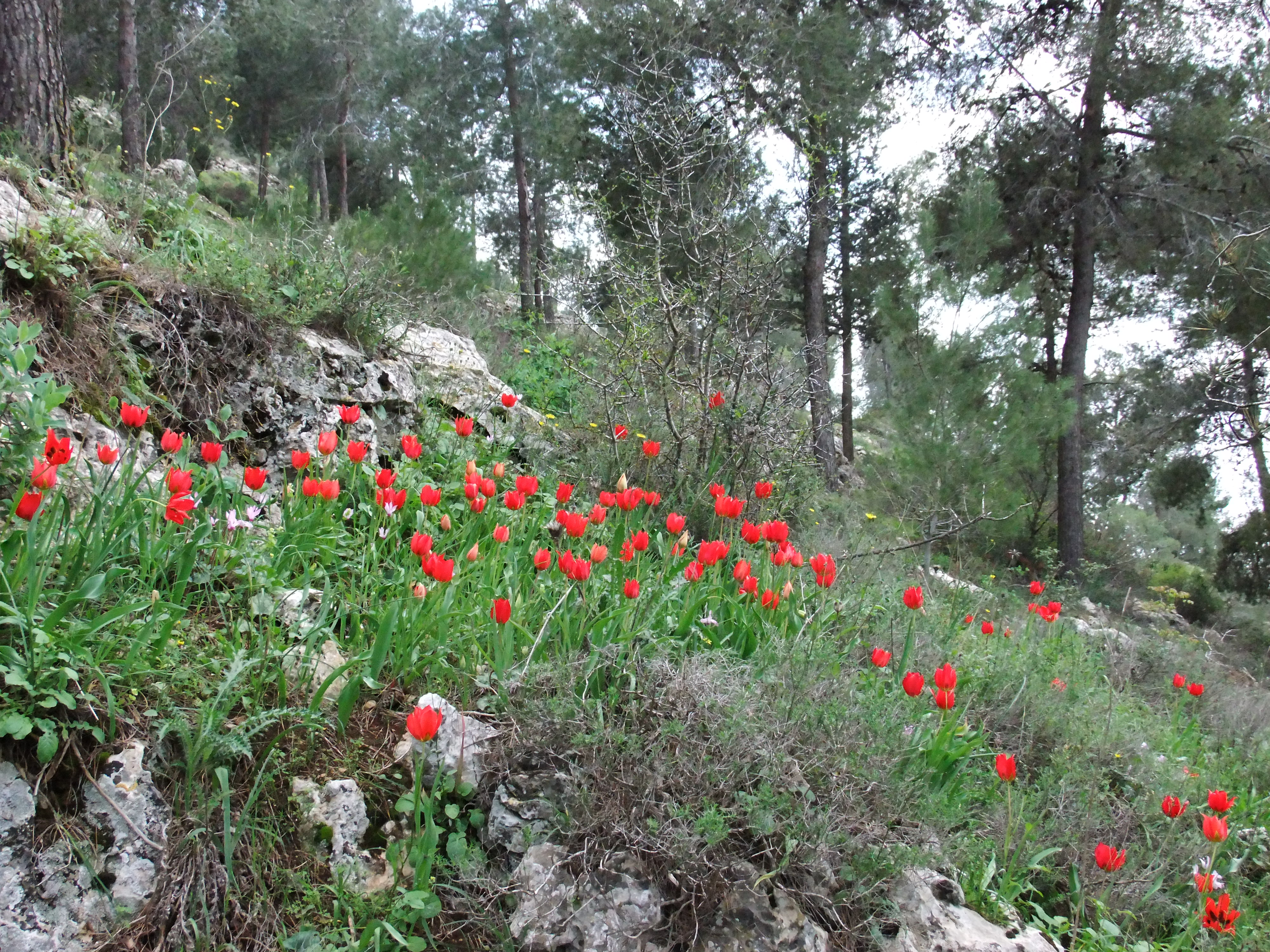
Jerusalem Forest, 2011

The first tree of the Jerusalem Forest was planted in 1956 by the second President of Israel, Itzhak Ben-Zvi. At its peak, the area of the forest covered 4,700 dunams (470 hectares). Over the years, the boundaries of the forest have receded due to urban expansion, and it now covers only 1,250 dunams (125 hectares).

The Yad Vashem Holocaust museum is located in the forest below Mount Herzl. In the middle of the forest, between Yad Vashem and Ein Kerem, is Mercaz Tzippori, a youth hostel. On this same campus is the office of "The Adam Institute for Democracy and Peace", an Israeli non-profit organization that runs educational programs promoting tolerance and coexistence.

The forest acts as a refuge for wildlife, and there are packs of jackals that inhabit the forest.

Saree Makdisi writes that brochures describing the forest present Nations Grove on Mount Herzl as a place where, after visiting Yad Vashem, "heads of state from all over the world are invited to plant trees symbolizing peace, cooperation and brotherhood."

== Conservation efforts ==
Projects by the Jerusalem Municipality such as the planned Jerusalem Road 16 threaten the continued existence of the forest, which causes concern among environmental organizations and residents of Jerusalem, especially those living in the nearby neighborhoods. At the end of the 1990s, environmental organizations and residents organized to fight for the future of the forest and its protection.

== See also ==
- List of forests in Israel
- Eshtaol Forest
- Wildlife of Israel
- Yatir Forest
