= David Yellin College of Education =

College in Jerusalem

Coordinates: 31°46.914′N 35°11.433′E

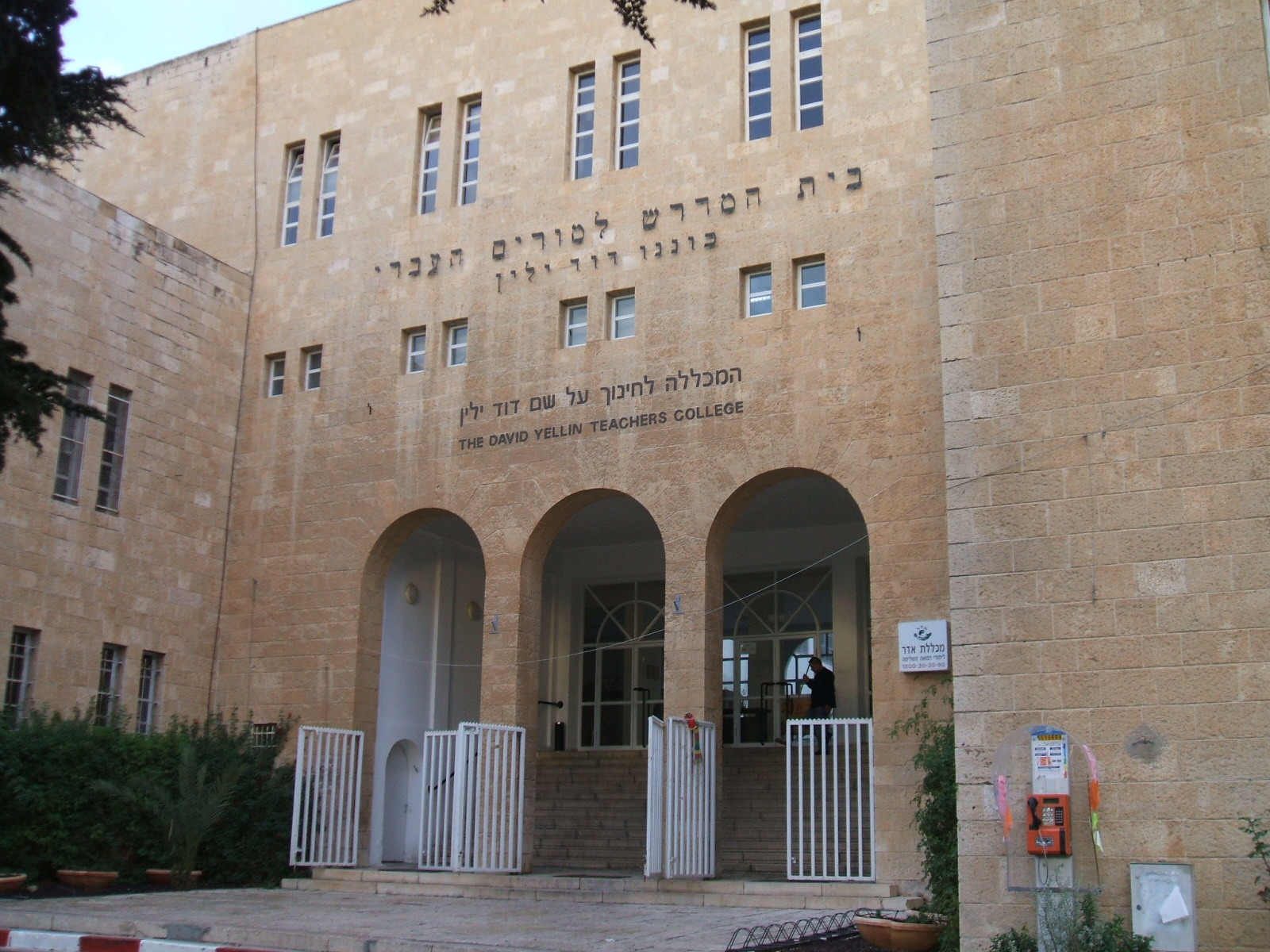
- Students: 5,000
- Website: www.dyellin.ac.il

David Yellin College of Education is an academic teachers' college in Jerusalem, Israel established in 1913.

The college is one of the first teachers' colleges in Mandatory Palestine that taught in Hebrew. Known as "Seminar Beit Hakerem" it was situated on a hilltop facing the Jerusalem neighbourhood of Beit Hakerem. The college is located on Ma'agal Beit Hamidrash (lit. "School Crescent"), named after the college.

The students of the college helped protect the Jewish targets of Arab violence in the 1929 and 1936–1939 riots, World War II, the 1948 Arab–Israeli War and the Six-Day War. They played an integral role in the defense and guarding system of Beit Hakerem and other areas in Jerusalem.

Today the college grants academic degrees in a wide number of subjects. The college's 5,000 students represent all groups of Israeli society; Jews (non-religious and religious), Arabs (Muslims and Christians), Druze and Circassians and new immigrants.

== History ==
The college is named after its founder and first principal David Yellin who established it in 1913 as part of the "War of the Languages" and the struggle to teach in Hebrew. The subsequent Principals were Ben-Zion Dinur (Dinaburg), Israel Mehlman, Avraham Even-Shoshan, Moshe Gil, Nissan Sheinin, Itai Zimran and Anna Russo. As of 2014, the institute's president is Prof. Zmira Mevarech.

In the early days studies were conducted in Hebrew with German as the second language. The first class started on 14 December 1913. Students comprised mainly boys from the age of 14. Admission included a health certificate and a "good behaviour" report card from an authority such as a rabbi or a school principal. Students had to pass entrance exams in Bible, Talmud, Hebrew, Jewish history and general studies. A good command of German, Hebrew and Turkish (the latter being the language of the Ottoman rule) was required. The college provided private teachers for students with learning difficulties and offered financial aid to poor families. The pupils were taught both high school and education studies to train them as teachers. After graduation, they were expected to teach for two years wherever the administration placed them. Between 1913 and 1938 David Yellin headed the "Hebrew Teacher's Institute".

Although World War I broke out a year after its establishment, teaching and education continued despite the difficult conditions of the Old Yishuv.

The college, established in Beit HaKerem, greatly influenced the development and character of the neighbourhood. It attracted teachers and intellectuals to the area in addition to those who founded the neighbourhood. The students rented rooms in local homes and became part of the local atmosphere. In the summer their rooms were let to tourists from the coastal area and so it became a centre for summer vacations. For many years the main synagogue was located in the seminar.

During the 1929 Palestine Riots, the residents of Beit HaKerem, along with adjacent workers district Kiryat Moshe and Bayit Vegan, old and young, took refuge in the seminary's unfinished building. The people occupied all the rooms while the hall (eventually to become the gym) was used as a cow shed. Guards armed with rifles were stationed on the roof of the building and fired at the rioters from Dir Yassin, a village west of the wadi, who tried to infiltrate the area and reach the seminary building. The residents were blockaded in the building for a week until the danger passed.

Today, the college awards a BEd degree and a teaching certificate in the following subjects: preschool education, elementary and high school education, special education, education for intellectual and developmental disabilities, informal education, open education, and anthroposophical education. It offers master's degrees in education (M.Ed.) and in the therapies: art therapy, music therapy, dance therapy, bibliotherapy, and in special education, teaching and learning, library and information science.

== See also ==
- Education in Israel
