= Givat Beit HaKerem =

Neighborhood in West Jerusalem

Coordinates: 31.773455°N 35.190435°E

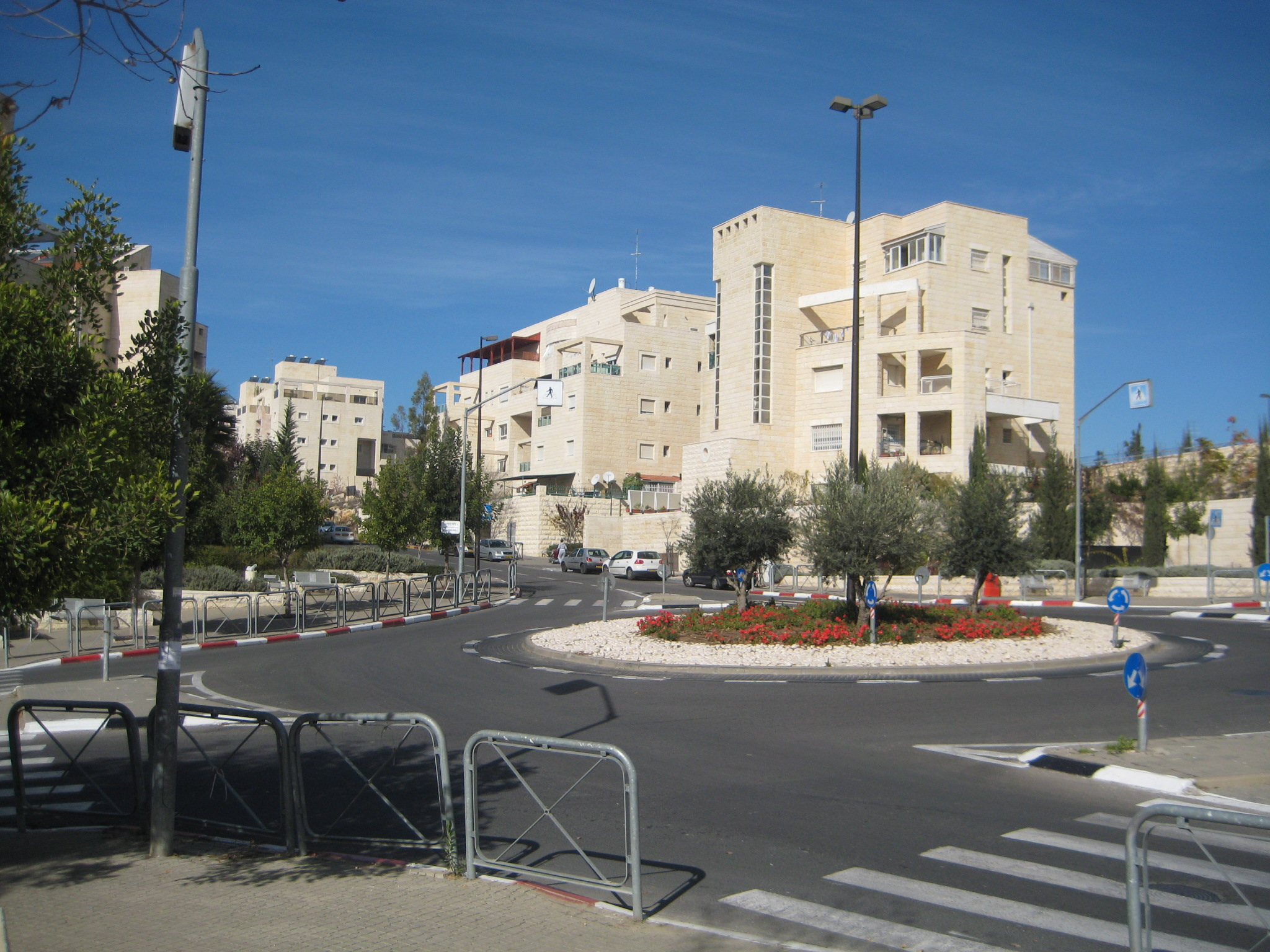
Givat Beit HaKerem

Givat Beit HaKerem (Hebrew: גבעת בית הכרם lit. Beit HaKerem’s Hills) is a Jewish neighborhood in Jerusalem. It is located in the west part of Jerusalem.

The neighborhood is bordered by Beit HaKerem, Ramat Beit HaKerem, Givat Ram campus of the Hebrew University of Jerusalem and Bayit VeGan.

Some authorities regard Givat Beit Hakerem, Ramat Beit Hakerem, Beit Hakerem and Yefeh Nof neighborhoods as one “ultra neighborhood” called “Beit Hakerem Rabaty” (lit: Broad Beit Hakerem).
