= Ramat Beit HaKerem =

Neighborhood in West Jerusalem

Coordinates: 31°46′13.34″N 35°11′30.27″E

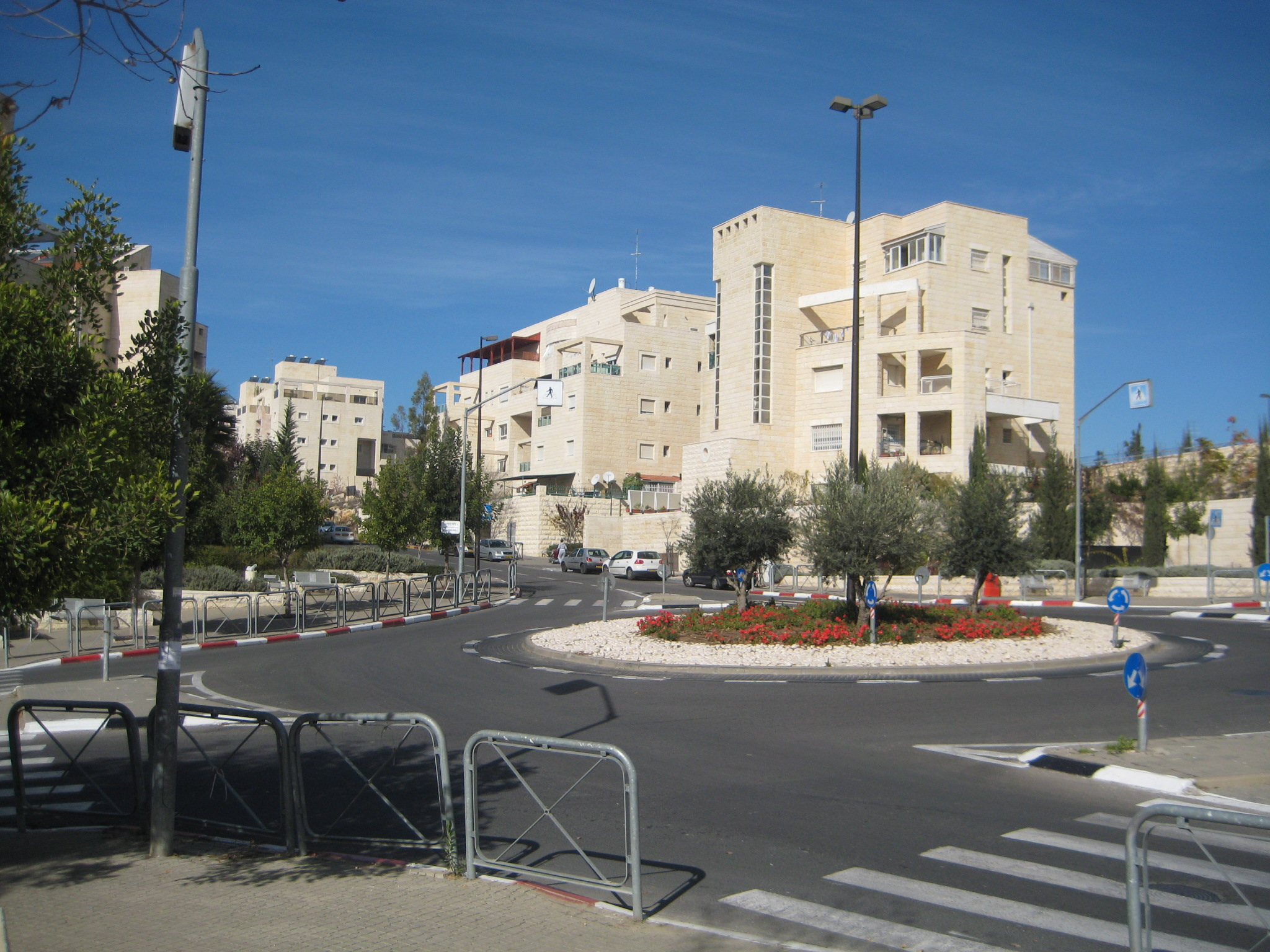
Ramat Beit Hakerem

Ramat Beit HaKerem (Hebrew: רמת בית הכרם, lit. Beit HaKerem Heights) is a Jewish neighborhood in Jerusalem. It was established in 1991 on a hill between Beit HaKerem to the north, the Givat Ram campus of the Hebrew University to the east, and Bayit VeGan to the southwest.

== History ==
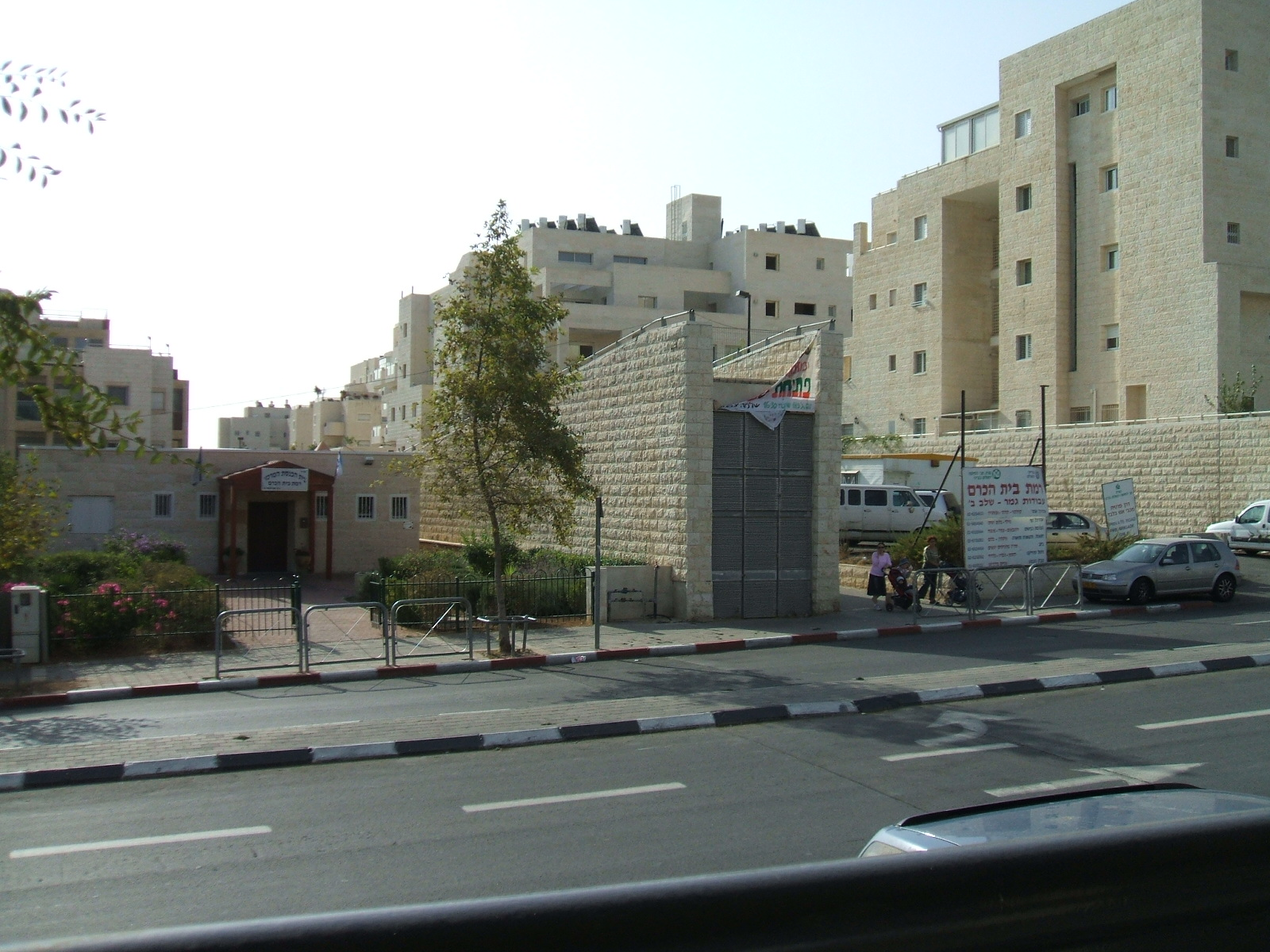
Houses in the neighbourhood

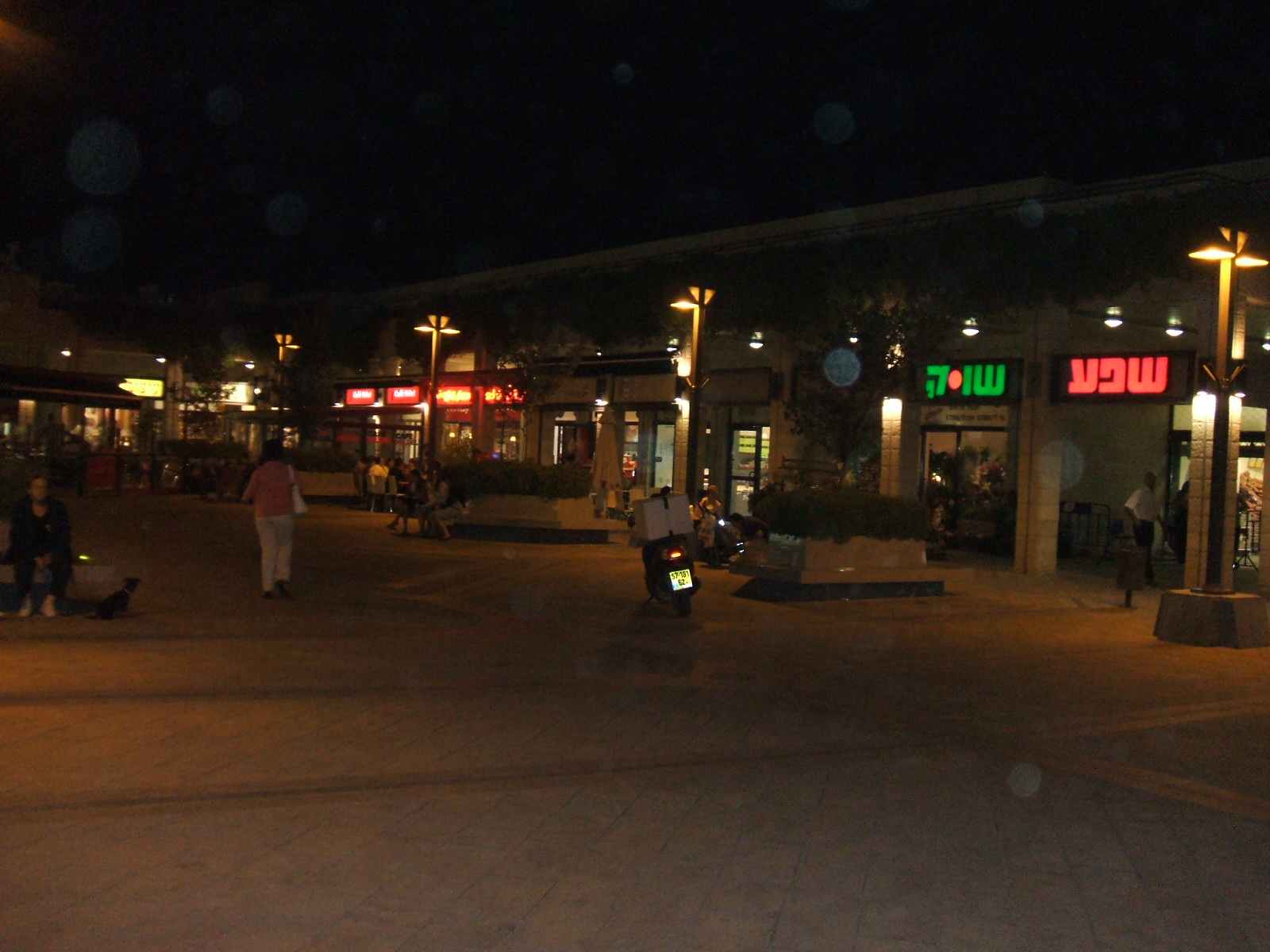
Ramat Beit HaKemer commercial center

In 1951, Israel Military Industries built a munitions factory on some of the land that became Ramat Beit HaKerem. It closed down in 1997, but environmental groups say the ground is polluted with toxic chemicals despite clean-up attempts. Ramat Beit HaKerem, Beit HaKerem, Givat Beit HaKerem, and Yefeh Nof neighborhoods are sometimes considered one "ultra neighborhood" called "Beit HaKerem Rabati" (lit. Greater Beit HaKerem). The master plan for the neighborhood includes 2,500 apartments.

The construction of Ramat Beit HaKerem began in 1991. The plan included 2,050 housing units, approximately 1,500 on land owned by the Israel Land Administration and the remainder on private land. In 1997, the second phase of the neighbourhood's construction began. By the end of 2003, around 1,200 housing units had been built. The neighbourhood was designed in a modern style, with road, drainage, and water infrastructure developed by the municipal company Moriah. Detailed planning and construction proceeded simultaneously, enabling rapid occupancy.

In January 2004, a tender was announced for the construction of 252 housing units near the evacuated IMI (Israel Military Industries) factory site, where soil contamination assessments and remediation efforts had been conducted since 1996 due to concerns over pollutants from the factory's operations. The new complex was built on the eastern side of Ramat Beit HaKerem but was not integrated into the neighbourhood itself, with plans for a new road connecting this sub-neighbourhood to the older Beit HaKerem area.

In 2006, a commercial center developed by the Rubinstein Group opened in the neighbourhood.

In 2009, bus line 14, which connected the Beit HaKerem neighbourhoods to the city center, was discontinued. As of 2024, the neighbourhood is served by Line 21 to Bayit Vagan and the railway station at Mount Herzl, Line 50 to the Jerusalem Central Bus Station via Old Beit HaKerem and Kiryat HaLeom, and Line 5 to Har Homa, passing through Mount Herzl railway station, Teddy Stadium, and the Talpiot industrial zone.

== See also ==
- Jerusalem College of Engineering
