= Yefeh Nof =

Neighborhood in west Jerusalem

Coordinates: 31.779292°N 35.186334°E

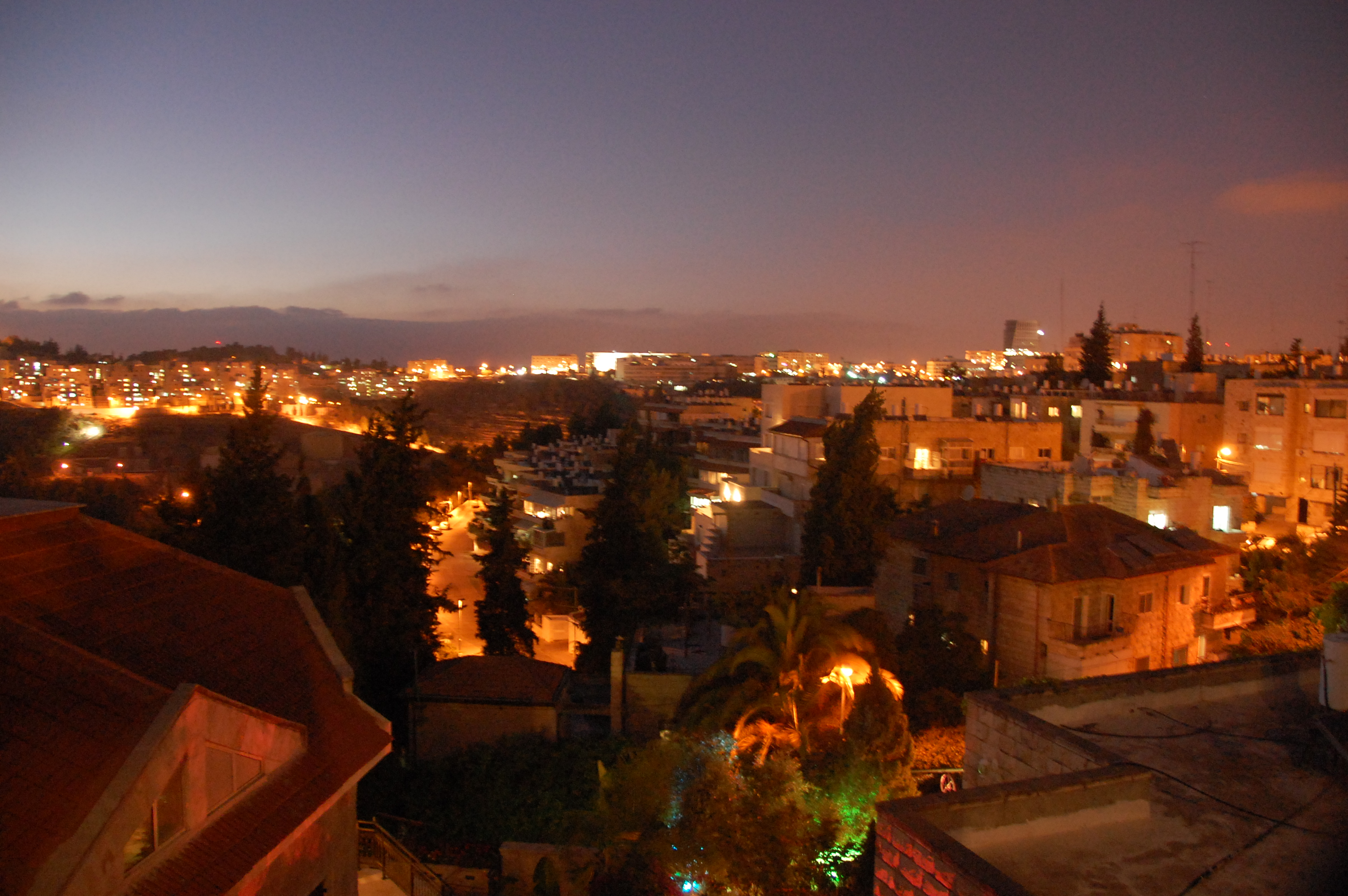
Yefeh Nof, August 2007

Yefeh Nof (Hebrew: יפה נוף) is a neighborhood in west Jerusalem, founded in 1929. Together with Ramat Beit HaKerem and Givat Beit HaKerem, it is part of the larger Beit HaKerem neighborhood. Its name is one of the seventy poetic names the Hebrew Bible uses for Jerusalem (Psalms 48:3), and literally means "beautiful view".

== Character of the neighborhood ==
The neighborhood is characterized by spaced building of three stories height, and a few cottages. At an elevation of 775 meters above sea level, the neighborhood offers views toward the Jerusalem Forest which resides in a nearby valley. In the 1930s, the neighbourhood was separated from the centre of the city, and the rent was among the lowest in the city.

=== Institutions ===
- Yad Sarah's main offices are on Herzl Boulevard
- The Yefeh Nof School
