= Kiryat Moshe =

Neighborhood in Jerusalem

Coordinates: 31.786734°N 35.195475°E

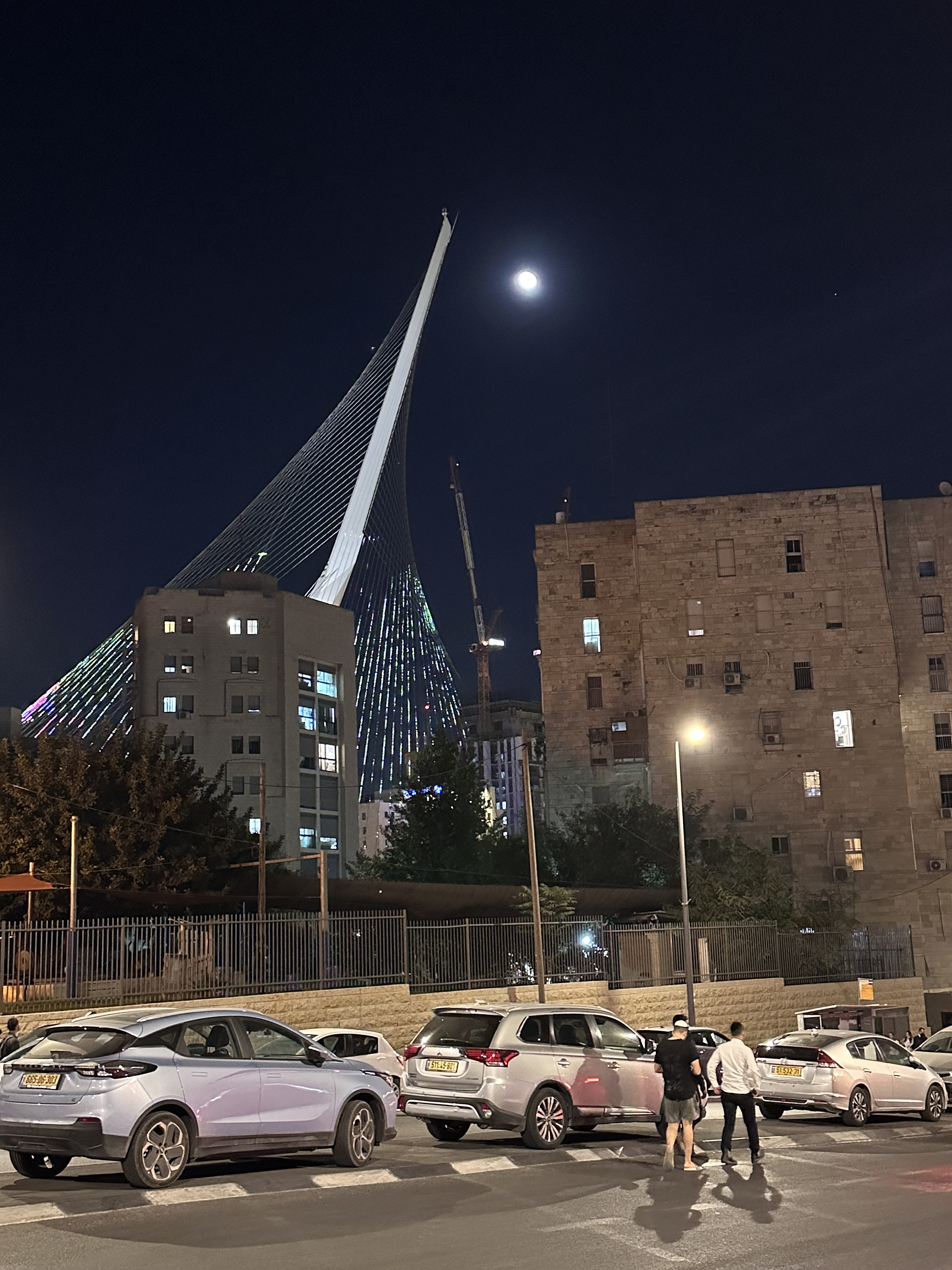
Kiryat Moshe

Kiryat Moshe (Hebrew: קריית משה) also colloquially referred to by locals as "Kricket Mo", is a neighborhood in Jerusalem, named for the British Jewish philanthropist Moses Montefiore. Kiryat Moshe is bordered by Givat Shaul and Beit Hakerem.

== History ==
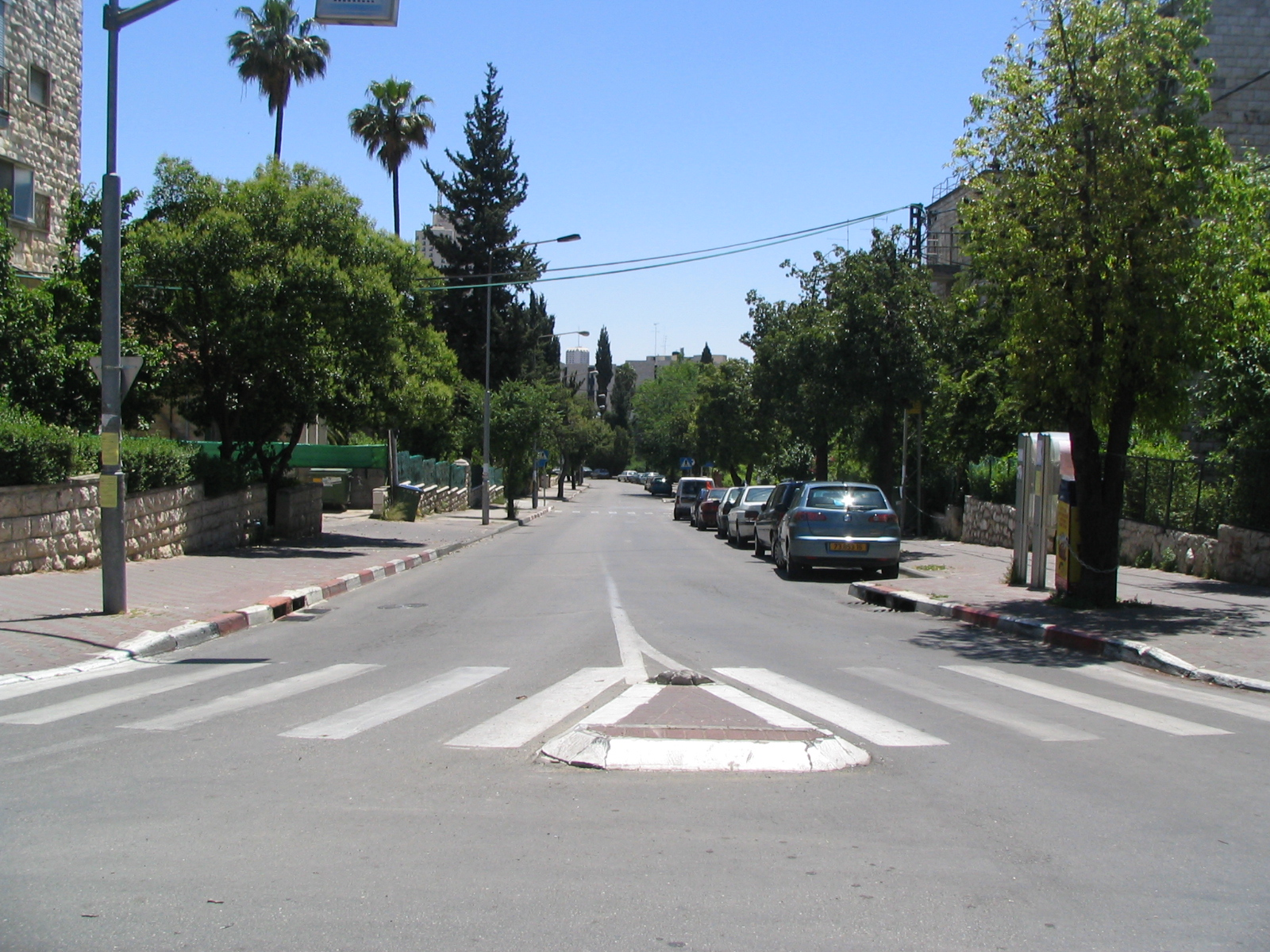
Kiryat Moshe Street in the centre of the neighbourhood

Kiryat Moshe was founded in 1923 with funding from the Moses Montefiore Testimonial Fund in London. It was one of the garden suburbs established in Jerusalem in the 1920s, along with Beit Hakerem, Talpiot, Rehavia and Bayit VaGan. Designed by the German Jewish architect Richard Kauffmann, these neighborhoods were based on clusters of single family homes surrounded by gardens and greenery. One of the main features was a central landscaped island, as can be seen on Hameiri Boulevard in Kiryat Moshe.

From the outset, Kiryat Moshe projected "Hebrew" pioneering, home to merchants and later teachers and bus drivers, both prestigious groups in the new Jewish society. Kiryat Moshe was designated as a national-religious neighborhood, and many rabbis and leaders of the Mizrachi movement settled there.

== Institutions and Buildings in the Neighborhood ==
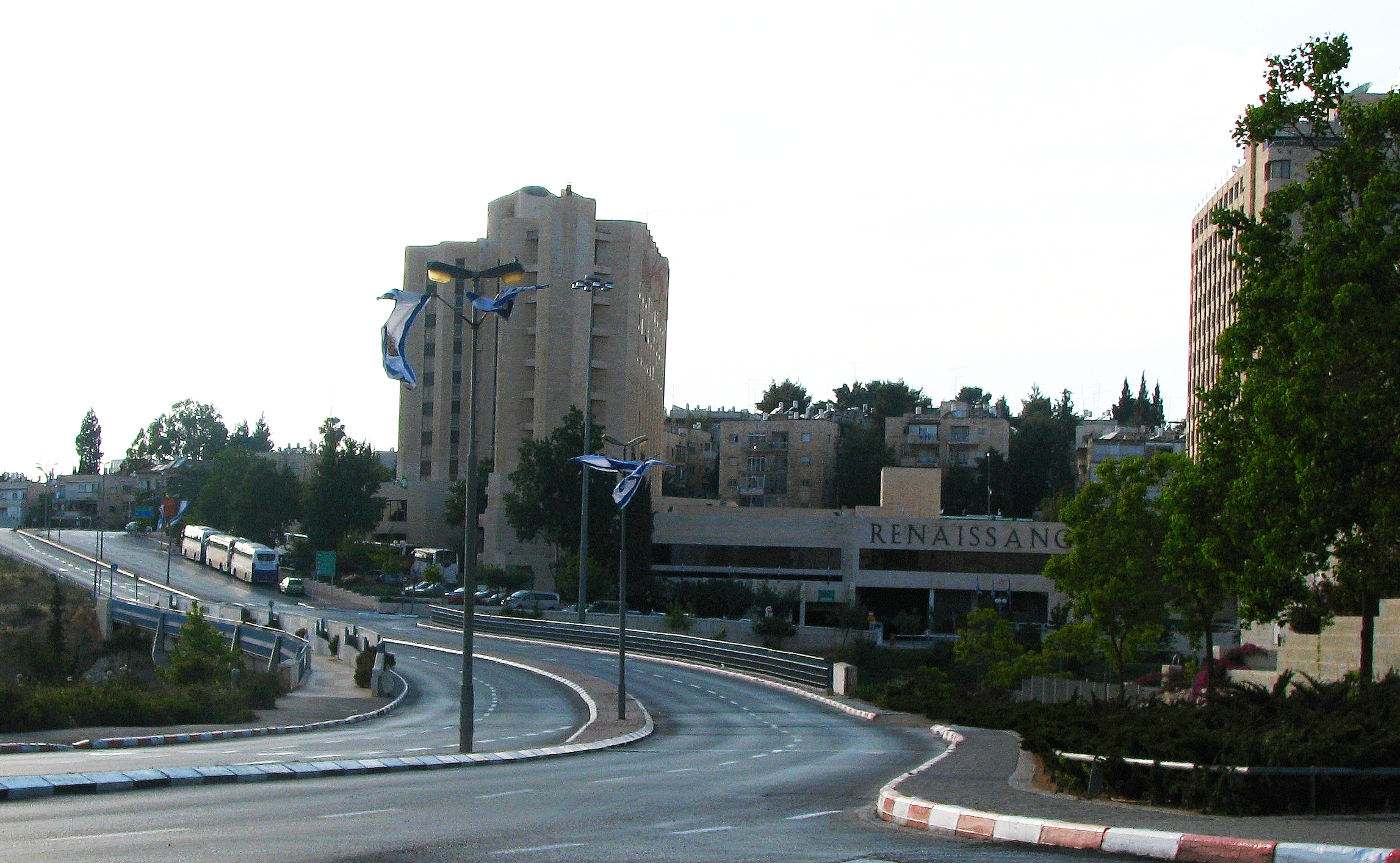
On the road to Kiryat Moshe

=== Blind Education Institute ===
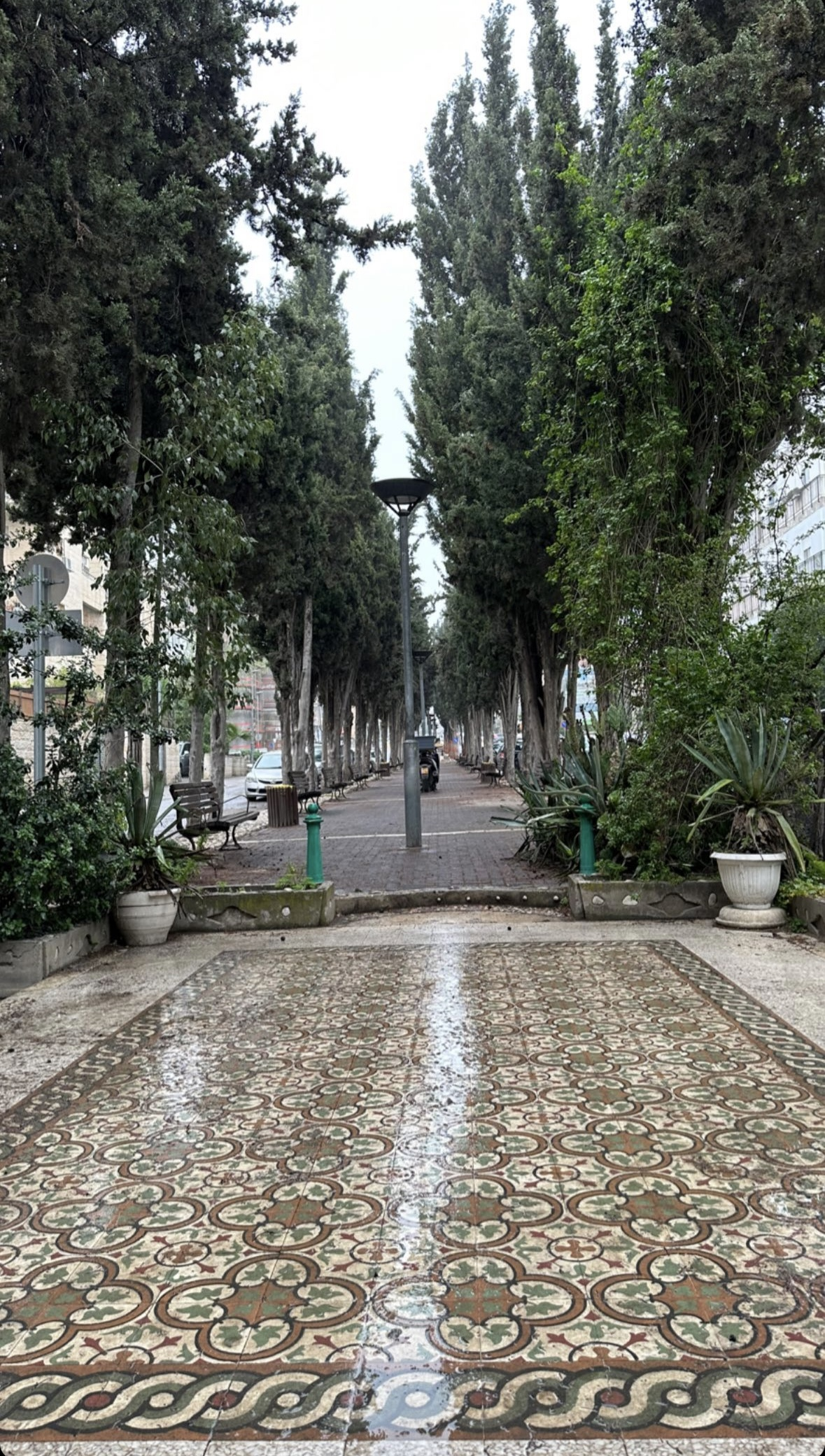
Hameiri Boulevard.

Founded in Jerusalem’s Old City in 1902 by Abraham Moses Luncz, the institute moved to its current location at HaRav Tzvi Yehuda Street 6 (formerly Ben-Dor Street) in 1932. Designed by British architect Charles Tegart, the building was structured to facilitate navigation for the blind. In the mid-1960s, the institute expanded with new wings to the north, near today’s Degel Reuven Street. It trains blind children and adolescents for integration into society, fostering learning and creativity. It is one of the oldest institutions in the neighborhood.

=== Mossad HaRav Kook ===
A publishing institution for religious-Zionist literature, founded in 1936 by Rabbi Yehuda Leib Fishman Maimon. It is housed in a Mandate-era building on the street named after him. In addition to its publishing activities, the site includes a kollel, a Torah library, and the "Beit Yehuda" synagogue in honor of Rabbi Maimon. The institution organizes an annual "Oral Torah Conference," attended by Israel's Chief Rabbis and other leading Torah figures. It was the central institution of the Maimon neighborhood, adjacent to Kiryat Moshe.

=== Mercaz HaRav Yeshiva ===
Mercaz HaRav was founded in 1924 by Rabbi Abraham Isaac Kook, the Chief Rabbi of Mandatory Palestine, the yeshiva initially operated from his home in the Beit David neighborhood. In 1964, a dedicated building was constructed on Ben-Dor Street in Kiryat Moshe. Around 2000, the street was renamed HaRav Tzvi Yehuda Street after Rabbi Kook’s son, Rabbi Zvi Yehuda Kook, who led the yeshiva for many years.

=== Jerusalem Yeshiva for Youth ===
A high school-level yeshiva affiliated with Mercaz HaRav Yeshiva, founded by Rabbi Yaakov Filber. It is located adjacent to Mercaz HaRav on HaRav Tzvi Yehuda Street.

=== Machon Meir ===
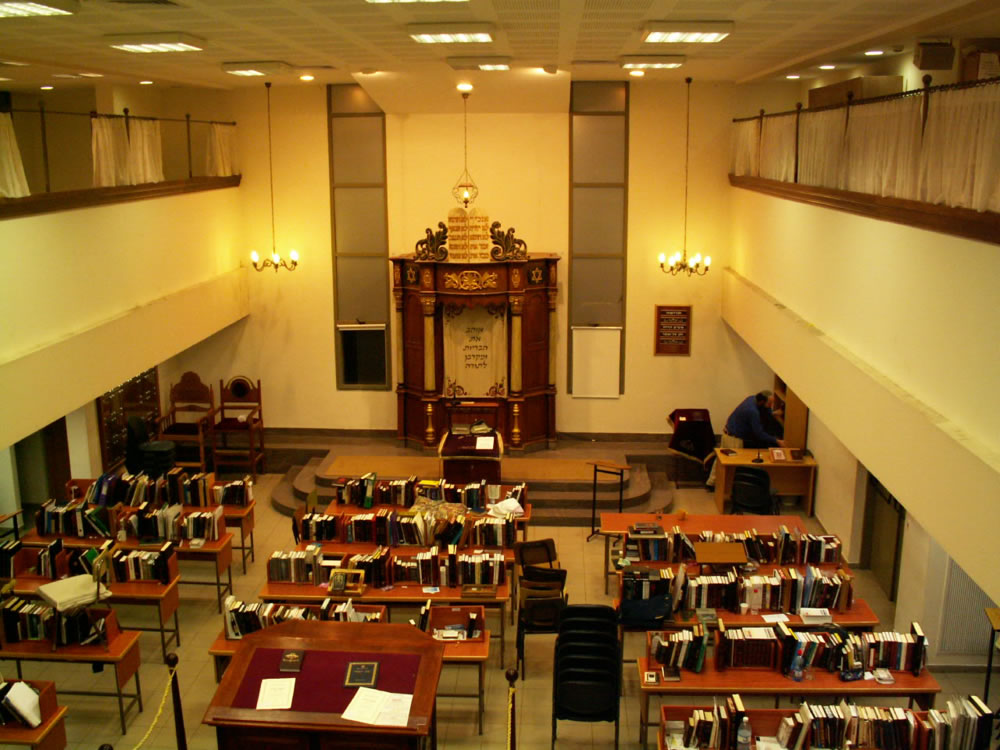
The Beit Midrash of Machon Meir.

Machon Meir is a national-religious yeshiva that serves as a study center for returnees to Judaism. It was established in 1974 by Rabbi Dov Begun, who remains its head. The institute occupies two interconnected buildings on HaMeiri Boulevard, with the newer structure completed around 2000.

=== Diskin Orphanage ===
Beit Sarah – A daycare center operated by the Emunah organization, promoting the status of religious Zionist women.

=== Asher Water Tower ===
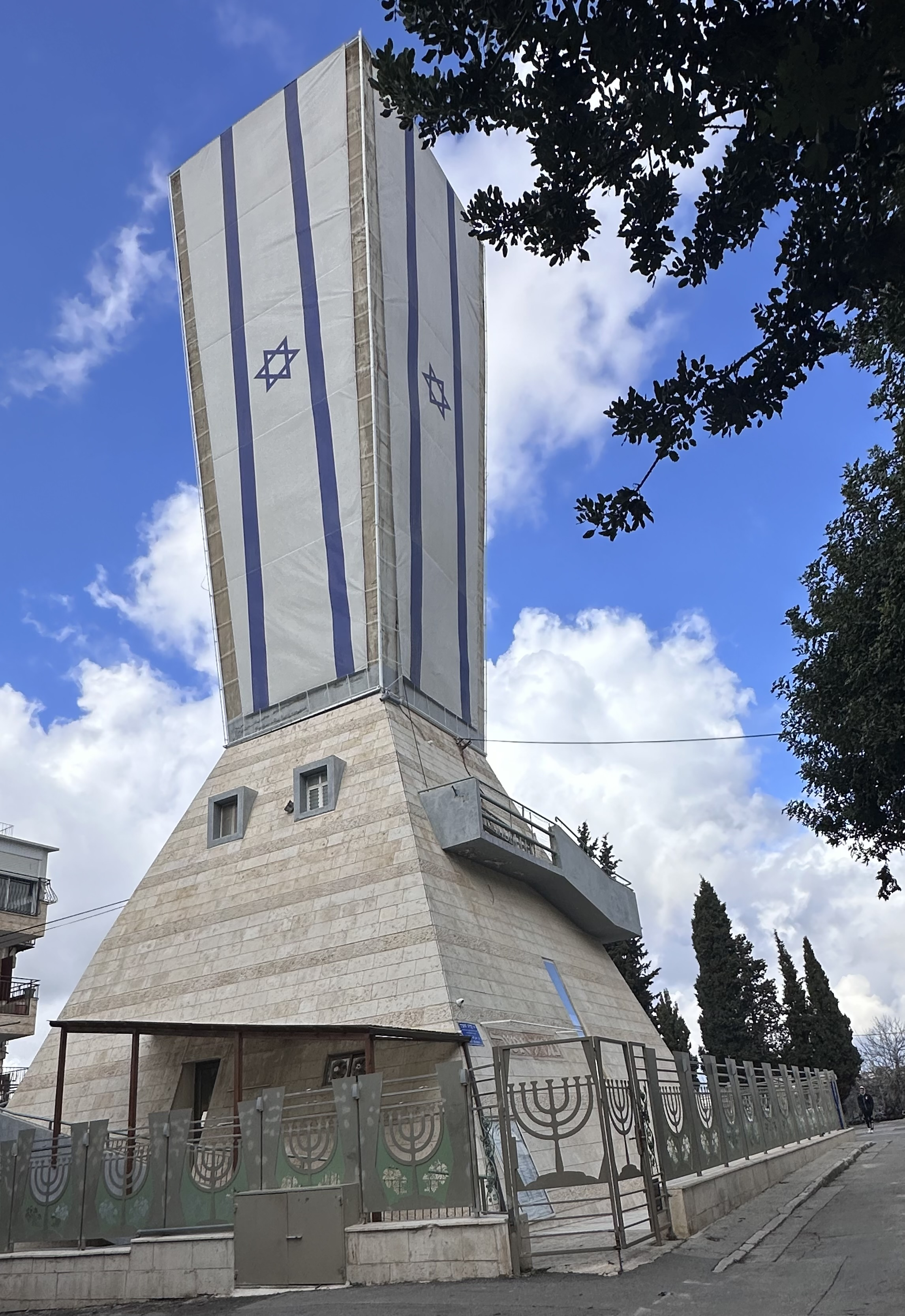
Asher water tower

Built in 1967 by architect Atzmon Zargari in the Brutalist style, featuring exposed reinforced concrete. It now serves as a synagogue led by Rabbi Yigal Shafran.

=== Heichal Yaakov Synagogue ===
A Sephardic-rite synagogue where Rabbi Mordechai Eliyahu served as rabbi. His office was located in the synagogue, which was founded in the 1980s on HaRav Reines Street. It is named after philanthropist Jacob Safra (father of Edmond Safra). The site also hosts the "Derech Hora'ah L'Rabbanim" kollel, led by Rabbi Yosef Eliyahu, son of Rabbi Mordechai Eliyahu.

=== Ohel Yitzhak Synagogue ===
An Ashkenazi-rite synagogue established with the neighborhood's founding as its central synagogue (as shown in the original neighborhood plan). It is named after Yitzhak Yaakov Yellin, one of its founders, who served as its cantor and head gabbai for many years. At the dedication ceremony on Tu Bishvat 1931, notable figures such as Rabbi Avraham Yitzhak HaCohen Kook and David Yellin were present.

=== Shikun Kiryat Moshe Synagogue (The White House) ===
A Nusach Sefard synagogue originally serving residents of the Gat housing complex. Today, it accommodates a broad range of worshippers from the neighborhood and beyond.

=== Etz Yosef Synagogue ===
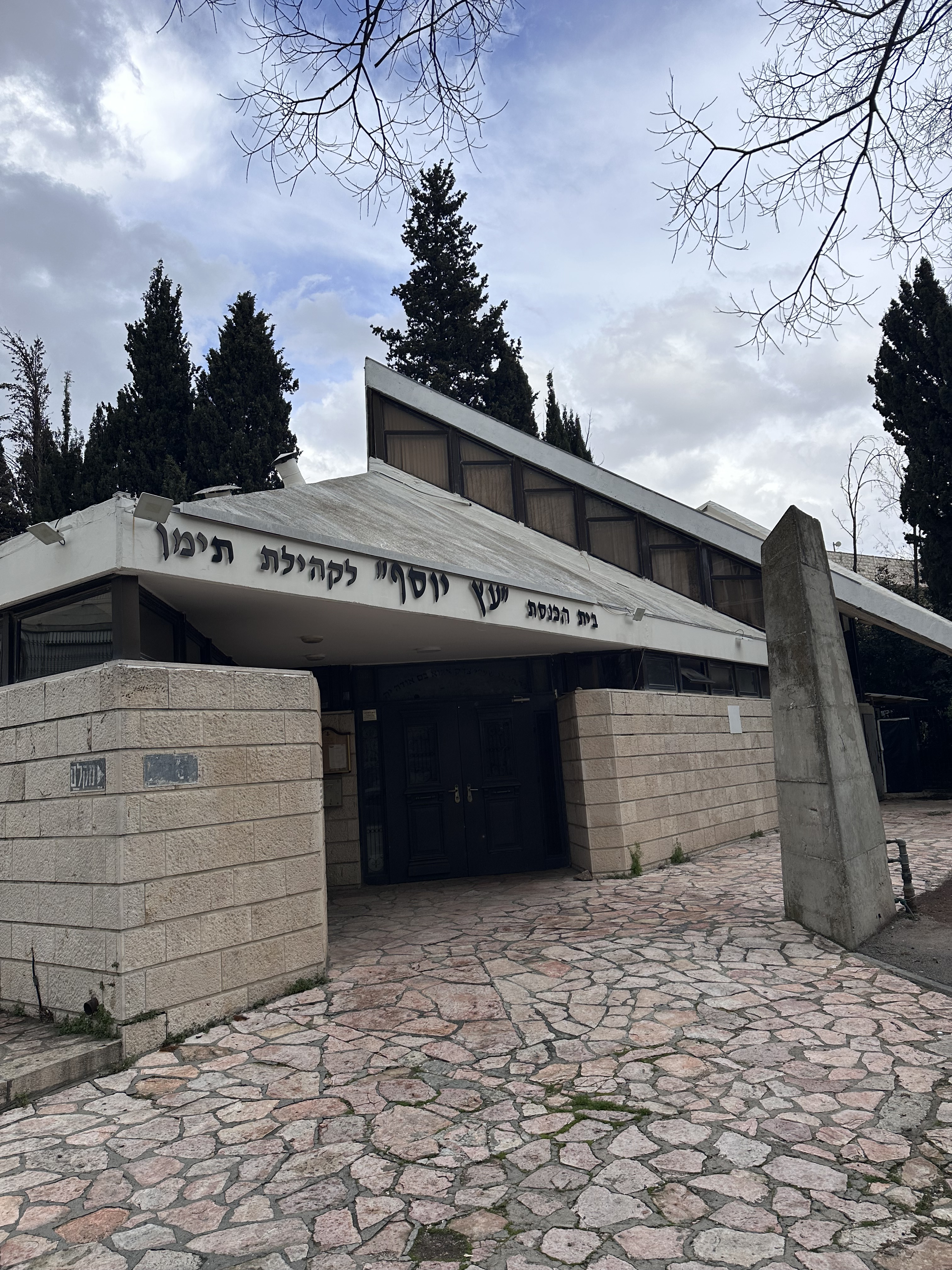
Etz Yosef Synagogue.

A synagogue serving the Yemenite Jewish community, named after Yosef and Dwalat Shashoni. Designed by architect David Cassuto, its tent-like structure reflects Yemenite traditions and nomadic influences. Located near the Weingarten Orphanage, it borders Givat Shaul on "Baal HaSheilot" Street.

=== Bnei Akiva Kiryat Moshe Branch ===
A local branch of the Bnei Akiva youth movement, established in 1971, located in the Maimon School complex.

=== Ariel Givat Shaul Branch ===
The first branch of the Ariel youth movement and one of its largest. The boys' activity center is in the Noam-Boys elementary school (on Haim Vital Street, Givat Shaul), while the girls' center is in the Noam-Girls school (on Basel Street, Kiryat Moshe).

=== HaMeiri Yeshiva ===
An academic hesder yeshiva affiliated with Lifshitz College. The building originally housed the Mizrachi Teachers' Seminary, which was previously the home of Rabbi Moshe HaMeiri, after whom the street is named (11 HaMeiri Boulevard). The first director was Eliezer Meir Lifshitz, and after his death, the college was renamed in his honor. The main campus is now on Hillel Street in downtown Jerusalem.

== Notable residents ==
- Ben-Zion Dinur
- Yehuda Liebes, Kabbalah scholar
- Meir Shalev
- Yitzhak Yaakov Yellin
- Ishay Ribo, singer-songwriter

== See also ==
- Mercaz HaRav massacre
