= Beit HaKerem, Jerusalem =

Neighborhood in Jerusalem, Israel

Beit HaKerem Hebrew: בית הכרם
- Neighborhood
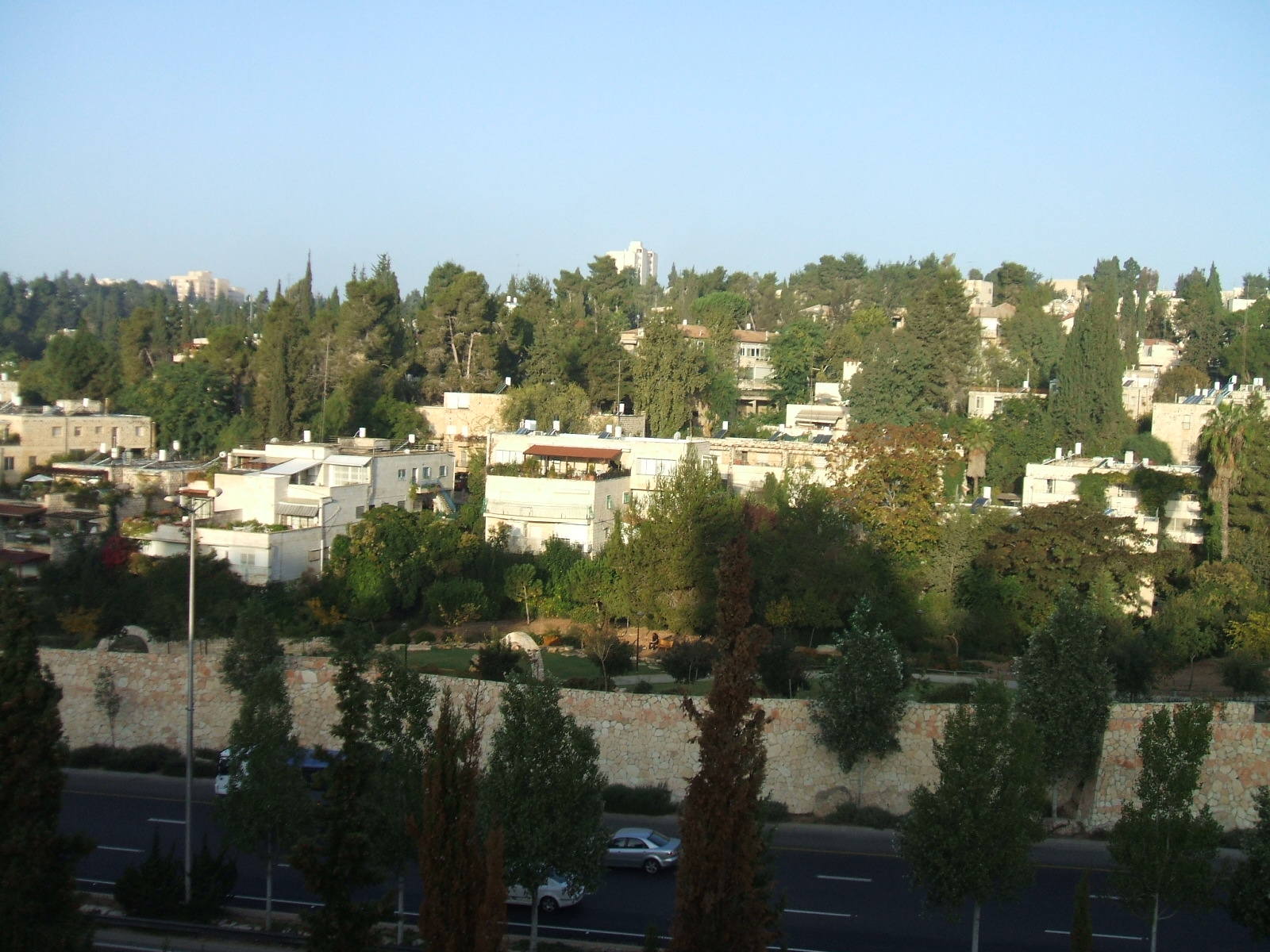
- Beit HaKerem, view from east
- Interactive map of Beit HaKerem
- Country: Israel
- District: Jerusalem District
- City: Jerusalem

Beit HaKerem (Hebrew: בית הכרם; lit. "house of the vineyard") is a largely secular upscale neighborhood in southwest Jerusalem. It is located between Kiryat Moshe to the northwest and Bayit VeGan to the south. Beit HaKerem has a population of 15,000.

== History ==
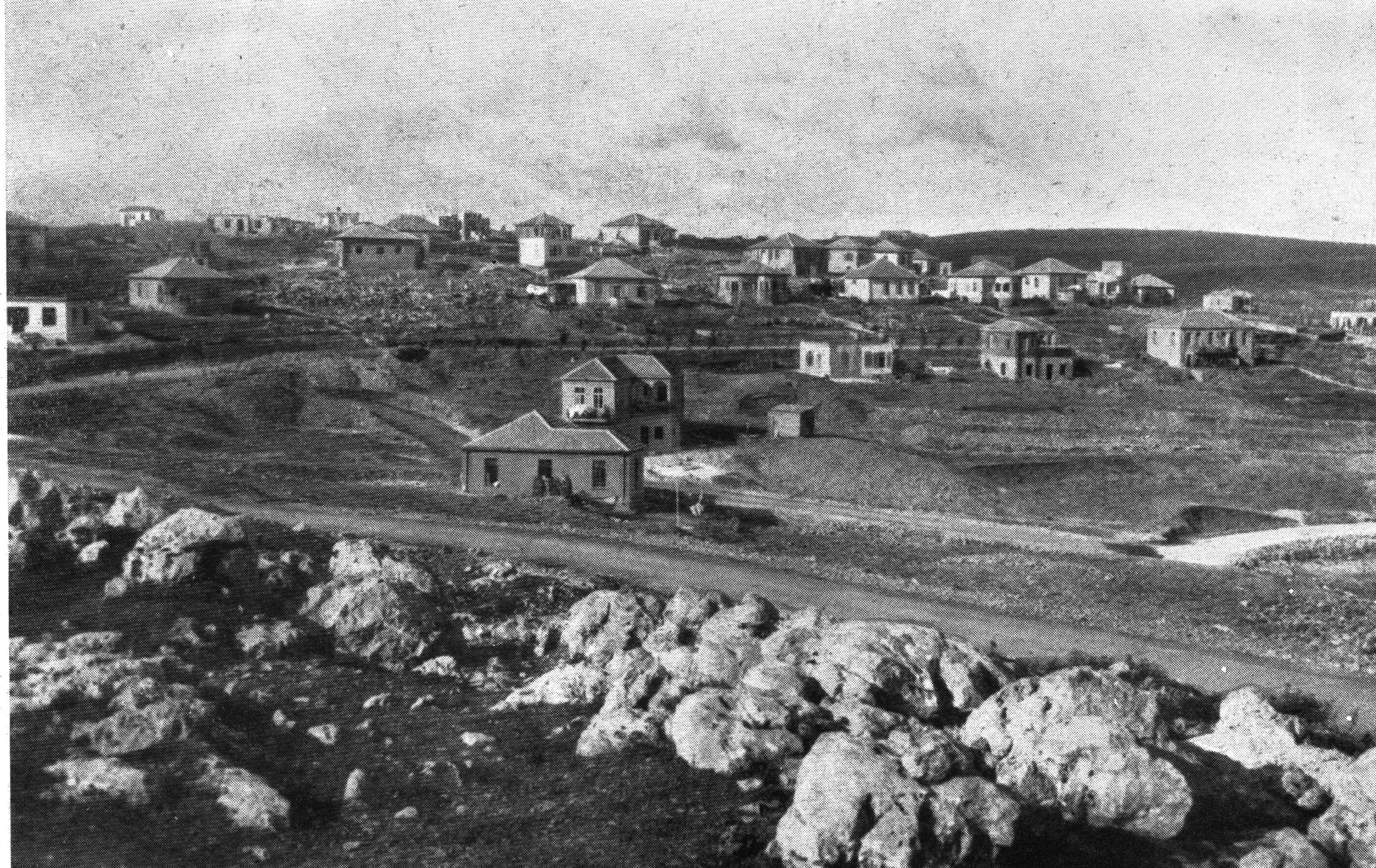
Beit HaKerem, c. 1925

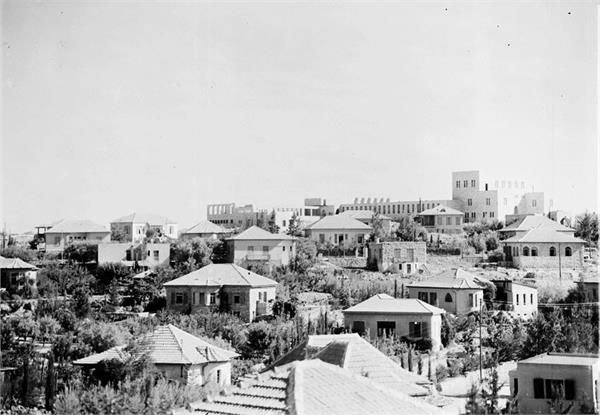
Beit HaKerem 1931

Remnants from the First Temple, Second Temple, Byzantine and Mamluk periods were discovered in a dig on HaSatat Street in 2006. It is named for the biblical city of Beit Hakerem near Jerusalem mentioned in Jeremiah 6:1 and Nehemiah 3:14.

The neighborhood was founded in 1922 as one of six garden cities developed in Jerusalem during the days of the British Mandate for Palestine. Beit HaKerem was planned by Ricard Kaufmann, an architect notable for his Bauhaus style, and was at the time separated from the rest of the city by large swaths of undeveloped land. Beit Hakerem has continued to maintain its 'green' character.

According to a census conducted in 1931 by the British Mandate authorities, Beit HaKerem had a population of 550 inhabitants, in 148 inhabited houses.

In the 1960s and 1970s, many university professors and students sought housing in Beit Hakerem due to its proximity to the Givat Ram campus of the Hebrew University, built when the Mount Scopus campus was cut off from Jerusalem in 1948. Beit HaKerem tends to vote left in elections. In the 2021 Israeli legislative election, the highest number of votes from Beit HaKerem went to Meretz (23%), Labor (16%), and Yesh Atid (15%).

== Education ==
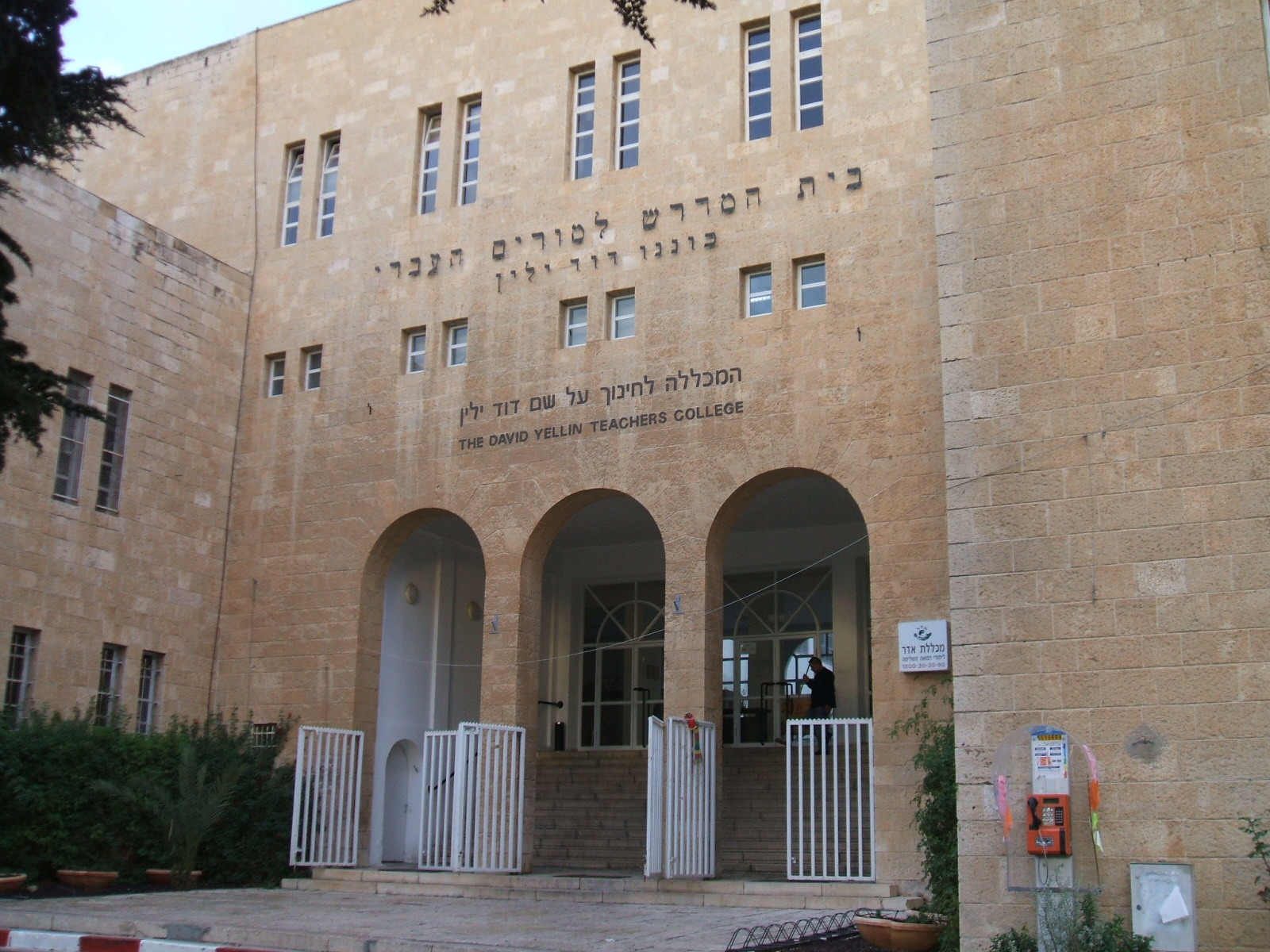
David Yellin Teachers College

The neighborhood has 25 kindergartens, four elementary schools and three high schools considered among the most prestigious in Jerusalem. The David Yellin College of Education, established in 1913, is located in Beit HaKerem, as is the David Shapell College of Jewish Studies. A footbridge from Beit HaKerem over the Begin Highway connects to the Hebrew University Secondary School and to the Givat Ram campus of the Hebrew University of Jerusalem.

== Parks and landmarks ==
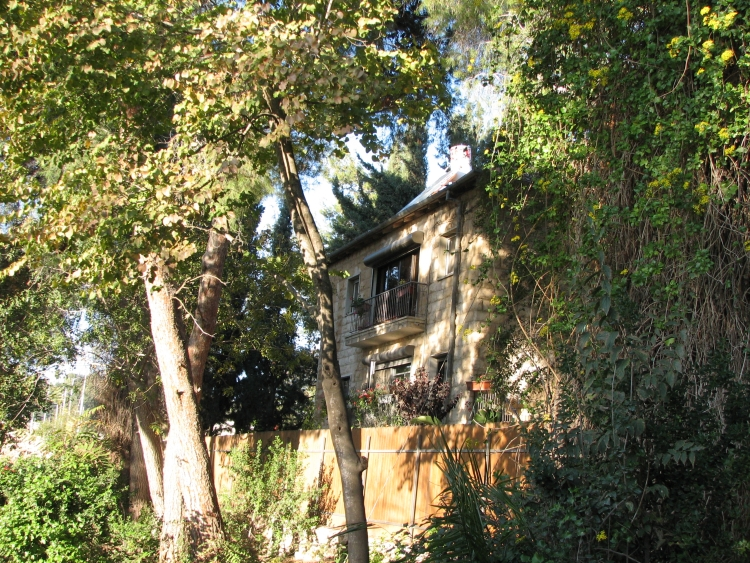
Historic homes in Beit HaKerem

Gan Ha'esrim park in Beit Hakerem (Park of the Twenty) commemorates 20 residents who died in the 1948 Arab–Israeli War. Denmark Square (Kikar Denya) honors the Danish people for rescuing approximately 93% percent of its Jewish population during the Holocaust. The monument in the square is shaped like a boat, recalling the boats on which Jews were smuggled to Sweden. Two connecting parks for kids, Gan HaShachar and Gan HaGai, are also located in the neighborhood.

== Transportation ==
The Jerusalem Light Rail, which began service in late 2011, passes through Beit HaKerem and has three stops there—Ha-'Haluts, Denia Square and Yefe Nof—providing convenient, rapid transportation to the Jerusalem Central Bus Station, the Binyanei Hauma international convention center, the new terminus of the high-speed rail to Tel Aviv (28 minutes), Cinema City, the Machaneh Yehudah market, as well as to downtown Jerusalem, Zion Square, the Ben Yehudah pedestrian mall, Jerusalem City Hall, the Mamilla shopping mall and the Old City near Jaffa Gate and Damascus Gate.

== Public services ==
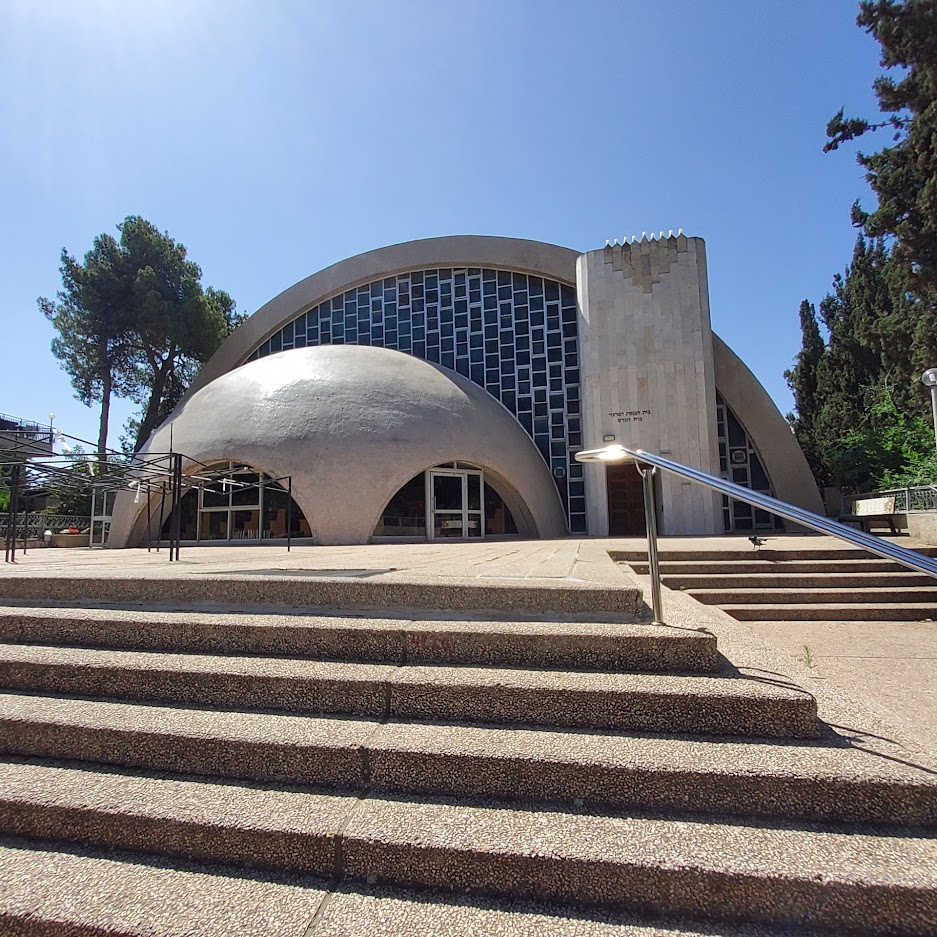
Main Synagogue of Beit Hakerem

Denmark Square in the center of Beit Hakerem adjoins a shopping center.

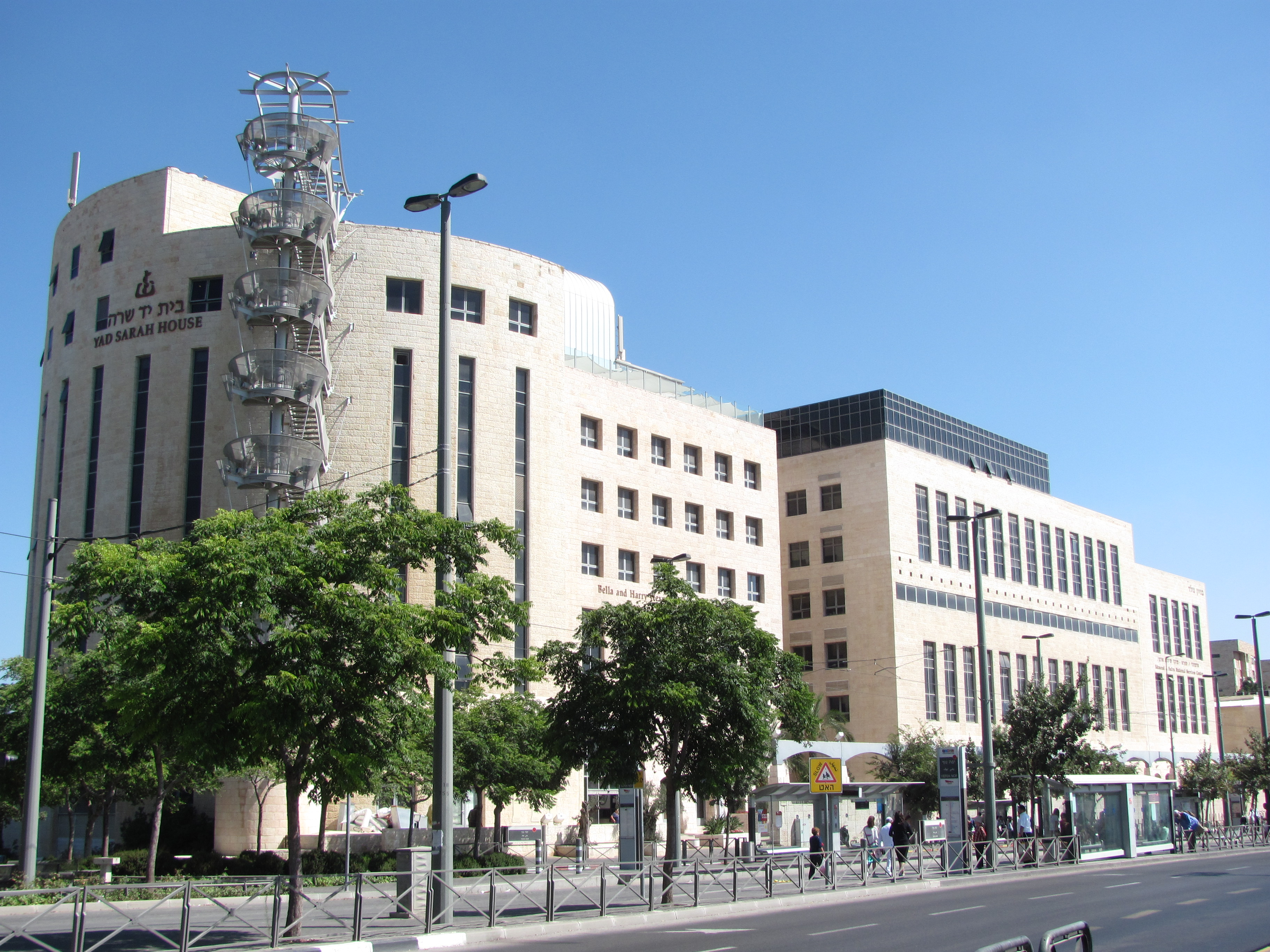
Yad Sarah, Beit Hakerem

Yad Sarah, the largest voluntary organization in Israel, which lends medical equipment and provides other services for free or at nominal costs is located in Beit HaKarem, along with Shaare Zedek Medical Center, one of Jerusalem's main hospitals.

== Notable residents ==
- Nir Barkat, former mayor of Jerusalem and current member of the Knesset
- Yehoram Gaon, singer, actor, director, producer, and TV and radio host
- Nehemia Levtzion (1935—2003), scholar of African history, Near East, Islamic, and African studies, President of the Open University of Israel, and Executive Director of the Van Leer Jerusalem Institute
- Elon Lindenstrauss, mathematician
- Reuven Rivlin, President of The State Of Israel
- Alice Shalvi, educator
- Karnit Flug, former governor of The Bank of Israel
- Ely Schiller, Archaeologist, publisher.
