= Rassco =

Rassco may refer to:

- Rassco (neighborhood)
- Rassco (company)
