= Oranim =

Oranim (Hebrew: אֳרָנִים, lit. 'Pines') may refer to:

- Givat Oranim, neighborhood in Jerusalem, Israel
- Givat Oranim (Haifa), neighborhood in Haifa, Israel
- Oranim Academic College, Israel

== See also ==
- Kfar HaOranim
- Oren, singular for "oranim"
