= Rassco (neighborhood) =

Coordinates: 31°45′45.16″N 35°12′10.98″E

Rassco רסקו
- Neighborhood of Jerusalem
- Givat HaVradim גבעת הורדים
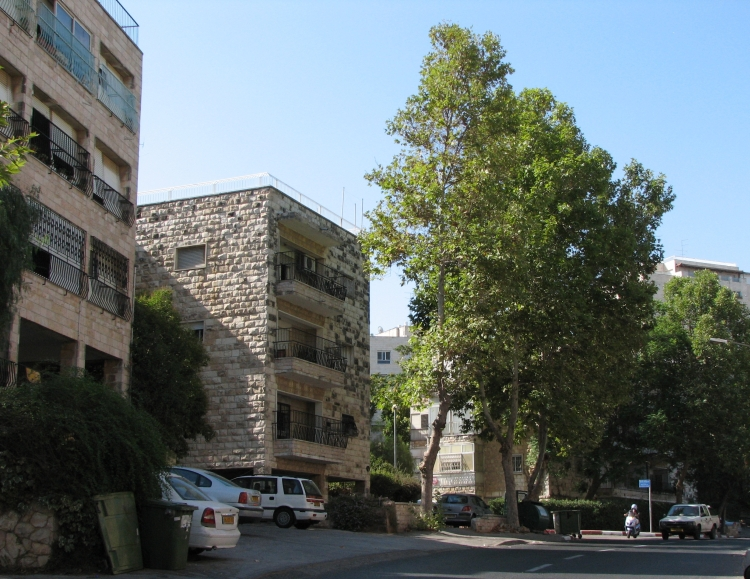
- Shim'oni Street
- Interactive map of Rassco
- Country: Israel
- District: Jerusalem District
- City: Jerusalem
- Founded: 1950
- Founder: Rassco company of the Jewish Agency

Population (2017)
  - Total: 5,000

Rassco (Hebrew: רסקו, officially Givat Havradim - "Rose Hill") is a neighborhood in central Jerusalem, built by the Rassco housing company. Rassco is located between Rehavia and Katamon.

== History ==
The neighbourhood was built starting in the 1950s by the Jewish Agency’s Rassco company to house government officials and their families who relocated from the center of the country to Jerusalem following the establishment of several key government offices in the city. The need to reduce costs during the austerity period allowed for the disregard of the British planning regulation requiring construction in Jerusalem to be done exclusively with Jerusalem stone.

In the 1970s and 1980s, the neighbourhood expanded with the construction of higher-quality apartment buildings and private developments. Most buildings were stone-clad apartment blocks built on stilts to allow parking underneath. This expansion created a continuous urban fabric connecting the neighbourhood to Rehavia and Kiryat Shmuel to the north, Katamon to the west, and Givat Oranim to the south.

As part of a new master plan for the neighbourhood, several areas have been designated for urban renewal, including high-rise towers of 18–20 stories. Plans for demolition and redevelopment projects are advancing at the intersections of Chernichovsky and Dov Kimhi Streets, as well as Chernichovsky and David Shimoni Streets. In July 2021, the local planning and building committee recommended depositing a plan for redevelopment on Chernichovsky Street, involving the demolition of existing residential buildings with 37 housing units and the construction of two 10-story buildings with 120 units. According to the plans, escalators will connect the neighbourhood to the Green Line light rail station on Herzog Street.

Young families moving into the neighbourhood have planted a communal garden as part of a wider initiative in Jerusalem to cultivate interest in nature and environmental protection.

== Streets and institutions of the neighbourhood ==
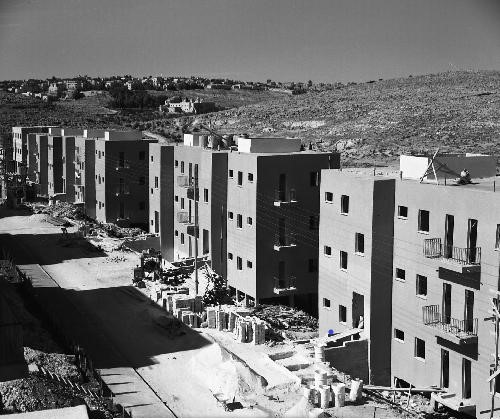
Rassco neighbourhood in Jerusalem being built in 1952.

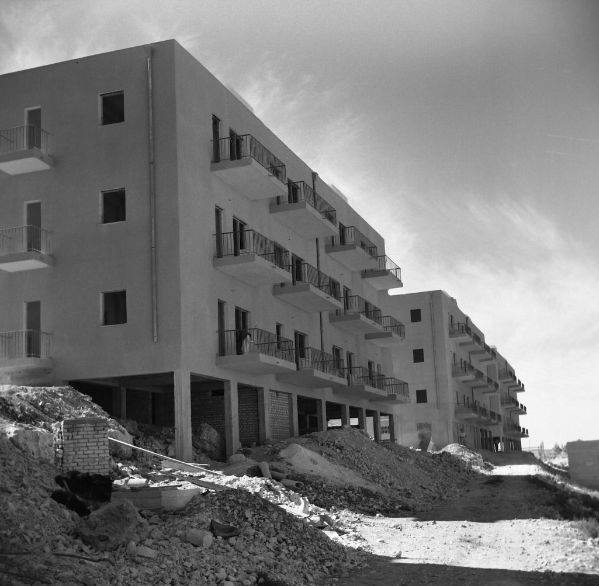
Rassco neighbourhood in Jerusalem being built in 1952.

The main streets of the neighbourhood are Chernichovsky (paved in 1955), Yitzhak Katzenelson, David Shimoni, Rabbi Herzog, and HaTekufa.

The neighbourhood contains several public buildings, including a municipal library and two central synagogues — one Sephardic and one Ashkenazi — on Shimoni Street, as well as the Chibat HaTorah Center for Jewish Culture on the same street. In the 1960s, the Bet hanoar haivri (Hebrew Youth Center), Israel’s oldest community center, relocated to Herzog Street. The neighbourhood also borders the Israel Goldstein Youth Village. Additionally, a Jewish Agency immigrant hostel was established in the neighbourhood and has been leased to the Israeli Volunteer Association since 1997.

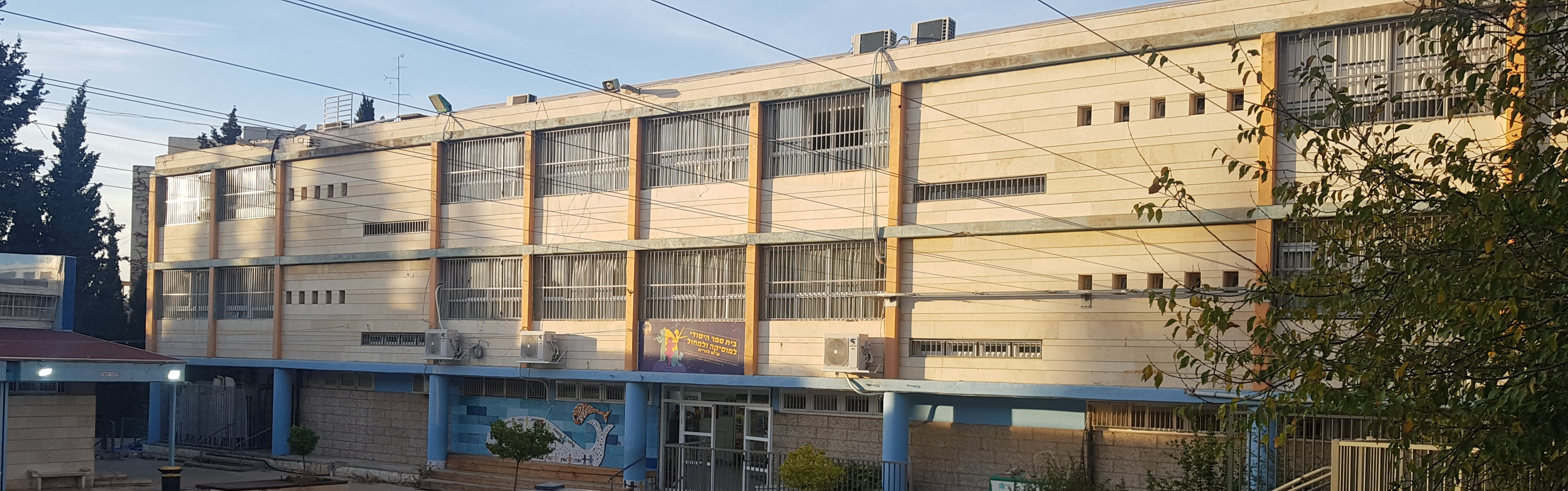
The new building of the Yosef Luria Elementary School, serving children from the Rassco neighbourhood, was completed in 2021. The Green Line of the Jerusalem Light Rail will include a station at the bottom of the neighbourhood on Herzog Street.

Children from the neighbourhood study in the Yosef Luria Elementary School (now the Luria School of Music and Dance), which was managed by principal Hadassah Briel-Noam from 1948 to 1974. Initially, the school operated in an old residential building at Palmach Street 57, before moving to a new location at the top of the hill above the neighbourhood at Palmach Street 79.
