= Sami Hadawi =

Palestinian scholar and author

- سامي هداوي
- Born: March 6, 1904; Jerusalem, Ottoman Empire
- Died: April 22, 2004 (aged 100); Toronto, Ontario, Canada
- Occupations: Writer, land specialist

Sami Hadawi (Arabic: سامي هداوي; March 6, 1904 – April 22, 2004) was a Palestinian scholar and author. He is known for documenting the effects of the 1948 Arab–Israeli War on the Arab population in Palestine and publishing statistics for individual villages prior to Israel's establishment. Hadawi worked as a land specialist until he was exiled from Jerusalem after a fierce battle in his neighborhood between Israeli and Jordanian forces. He continued to specialize in documenting Palestine's lands and published several books about the 1948 Palestine war and the Palestinian refugees.

== Early life ==
Hadawi was born in Jerusalem to Palestinian Anglican Christian parents. His father was a soldier in the army of the Ottoman Empire and died in combat during World War I. In 1915, after his father's death, Hadawi's family moved to Amman, Jordan. Three years later, he worked as an unofficial interpreter for the British Army and then moved back to Palestine the year after to work as a clerk for the Land Registration Office.

His interest in the structure of Arab villages began with his job there and then his job at the Land Settlement Department from 1920 to 1927. Hadawi eventually became an inspector and land value assessor from 1938 to 1948 and was the major contributor to the Village Statistics, 1945: A Classification of Land and Area Ownership in Palestine, a document detailing demographics and land ownership in Mandatory Palestine. He lived in his grandfather's home in the Jewish Quarter of the Old City until 1948. In 1948, he, his wife Nora and their two children built a home for themselves in Katamon. That same year, they were forced to leave with the advance of Israeli forces.

== After exile ==
Hadawi had similar work with Jordanian land authorities as he did with the British. He retained that job until 1952 when he became a land specialist for the United Nations Conciliation Commission for Palestine in New York City. His job was to determine the extent of property that Palestinian refugees left behind after the 1948 War. This led him to co-found the Palestinian Information Office in 1959 and then two Arab League offices in the United States. His final work years were as Director of the Institute for Palestine Studies (IPS) in Beirut throughout 1960–70 in which he published Palestine – Loss of a Heritage.

Hadawi's wife died of a heart attack in 1965. He retired in 1970, moved to Toronto in Canada, and began writing books on the history of the Israeli–Palestinian conflict, including Palestinian Rights and Losses in 1948 (1988) and Bitter Harvest: a Modern History of Palestine (1989). Hadawi died on April 22, 2004, at the age of 100. He was buried in Toronto instead of his desired request to be buried in his hometown of Jerusalem. "I would like to be buried in Jerusalem, but I have no choice," he told journalist Hicham Safieddine, in the last interview he gave.

== Publications ==
- Land ownership in Palestine, New York: Palestine Arab Refugee Office, 1957
- Palestine partitioned, 1947–1958, New York: Arab Information Center, 1959
- Israel and the Arab minority, New York: Arab Information Center, 1959
- Israel according to Holy scriptures, Dallas, Texas : [s.n.], 1960
- Palestine: questions and answers. , New York: Arab Information Center, 1961
- German reparation versus Israeli confiscations, New York: Arab Information Center, 1961
- Who benefits from anti-Semitism, New York: Arab Information Center, 1961
- Palestine Loss of Heritage, San Antonio, Texas: The Naylor Co., 1963
- Palestine in the United Nations New York : Arab Information Center, 1964 (Information paper #24)
- Bitter Harvest: Palestine 1914–1967, New York: New World Press, 1967
- The case of Palestine before the 23rd session of the United Nations, October–December 1968, 1969
- Palestine in focus, Palestine Liberation Organization Research Center: 1969
- Village statistics, 1945: A classification of land and area ownership in Palestine, Palestine Liberation Organization Research Center: 1970
- The Palestine Diary : Volume I and II, New World Press: 1972
- Crime and no punishment: Zionist Israeli terrorism, 1939–1972 (Palestine essays), Palestine Liberation Organization Research Center: 1972
- Bitter Harvest, Palestine Between 1914–1979, Caravan Books: 1979 ISBN 978-0-88206-025-5
- The Jews, Zionism, and the Bible: (a study of 'Biblical' and 'historical' claims) , Toronto, Ontario: The Arab Palestine Association, 1981
- Palestinian Rights and Losses in 1948: A Comprehensive Study, Saqi Books: 2000 ISBN 0-86356-157-8

== See also ==
- Walid Khalidi

=== Archives ===
There is a Sami Hadawi fonds at Library and Archives Canada. The archival reference number is R6420.
