= Museum for Islamic Art, Jerusalem =

Museum in Jerusalem

- معهد ل. أ. مئير للفن الإسلامي (Arabic)
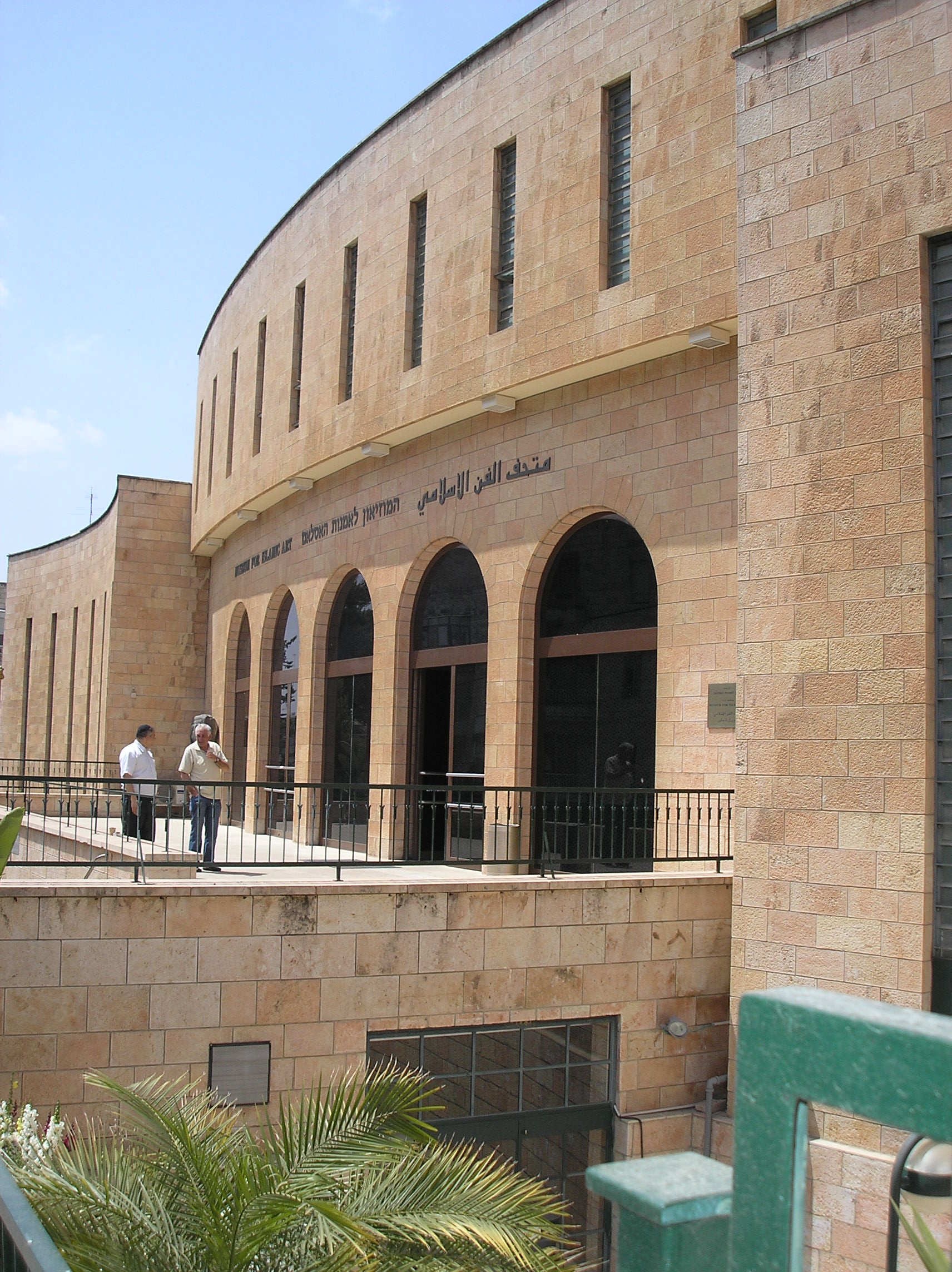
- Established: 1974
- Location: 2 HaPalmach St; Katamon, Jerusalem
- Coordinates: 31°46′7.42″N 35°12′46.21″E
- Type: Art museum
- Collections: Islamic art David Salomons clock and watch collection
- Founder: Vera Bryce Salomons
- Website: www.islamicart.co.il/english/

The L. A. Mayer Museum for Islamic Art (formerly known as the L.A. Mayer Institute for Islamic Art) (Hebrew: מוזיאון ל. א. מאיר לאמנות האסלאם; Arabic: معهد ل. أ. مئير للفن الإسلامي) is an art museum in Jerusalem, established in 1974. Located on the corner of HaPalmach Street in Katamon, near the Jerusalem Theatre, it houses Islamic pottery, textiles, jewelry, ceremonial objects and other Islamic cultural artifacts and a rare clocks' collection.

== History ==
The museum was founded by Vera Bryce Salomons, daughter of Sir David Lionel Salomons (nephew of the first Jewish Lord Mayor of London), in memory of her friend and teacher, Leo Aryeh Mayer, rector of the Hebrew University of Jerusalem, a scholar of Islamic art who died in 1959. Salomons specified that the museum would remain financially independent, unsupported by public funding. The building was designed by Alexander Friedman and construction began in 1965. The first director was Gabriel Moriah.

The museum has nine galleries organized in chronological order, exploring the beliefs and art of Islamic civilization. In addition to Mayer's private collection, the museum houses antique chess pieces, dominoes and playing cards; daggers, swords, helmets; textiles; jewelry; glassware, pottery and metalware produced in Islamic countries, from Spain to India. A collection of Islamic carpets was added in 1999.

Nadim Sheiban was appointed director of the museum in 2014. His first move was to transform the weapons hall in the entrance into a space for temporary exhibitions.

== Rare clock collection ==
A gallery in the museum also displays the David Salomons clock and watch collection.

On 15 April 1983, some 200 items, including paintings and dozens of rare clocks and watches, were stolen when the museum was burgled. Among the stolen timepieces was the watch known as the "Marie Antoinette", the so-called "Mona Lisa" of watches, and the crown jewel of the watch collection, made by the famed French-Swiss watchmaker Abraham-Louis Breguet reputedly for Queen Marie Antoinette, and estimated to be worth US$30 million. It was part of a unique collection of 57 Breguet timepieces donated to the museum by Vera Bryce Salomons.

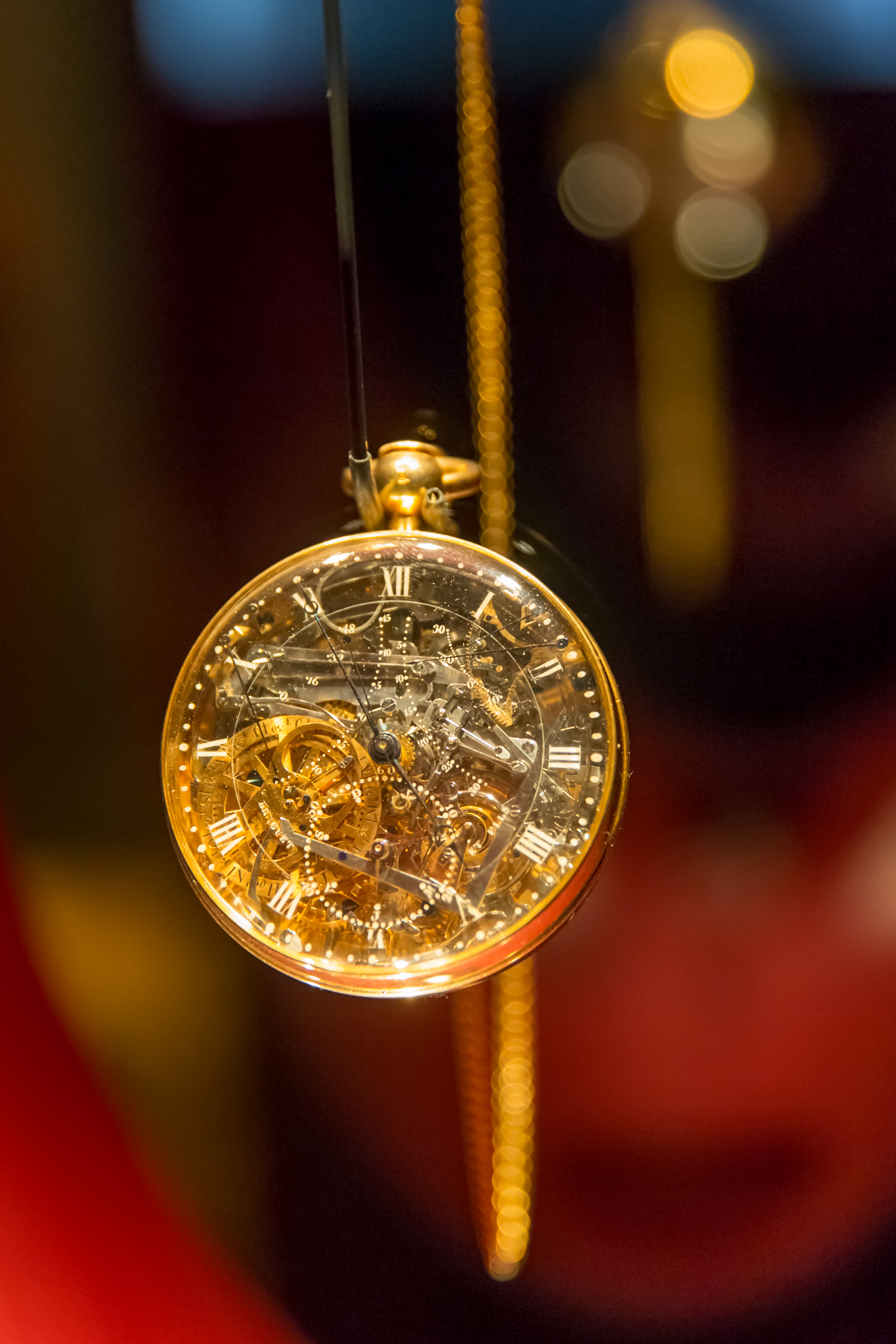
Marie Antoinette watch

The case remained unsolved for more than 20 years. In August 2006, a breakthrough occurred when a Tel Aviv antiques appraiser contacted the museum. The appraiser reported that some of the stolen items were being held by a local lawyer whose client, having inherited them from her deceased husband, wished to sell them back to the museum. Although the original asking price was US$2 million (the amount of the reward offered in the case), it was negotiated down to US$35,000. The items returned included the "Marie Antoinette" watch and a valuable "Sympathique" clock, both by Breguet.

The investigation intensified following this recovery. A subsequent search of an Israeli warehouse yielded documents that led to safety deposit boxes in Israel, Germany, the Netherlands, and the United States, all owned by the thief, Naaman Diller. Police identified the seller as Nili Shamrat, an expatriate Israeli who had married Diller in 2003. She told police that just before her husband's death in 2004, he had confessed and advised her to sell the collection. Shamrat was arrested in May 2008, after a house search by Israeli and American investigators uncovered several more stolen clocks, rare 18th-century paintings, and catalog cards bearing the names of the clocks and their manufacturers.

On November 18, 2008, French and Israeli police officials discovered 43 more stolen timepieces in two bank safes in France. Of the 106 rare timepieces stolen in 1983, 96 were recovered.

On April 3, 2010, Shamrat was sentenced to 300 hours of community service and given a five-year suspended sentence for possession of stolen property.

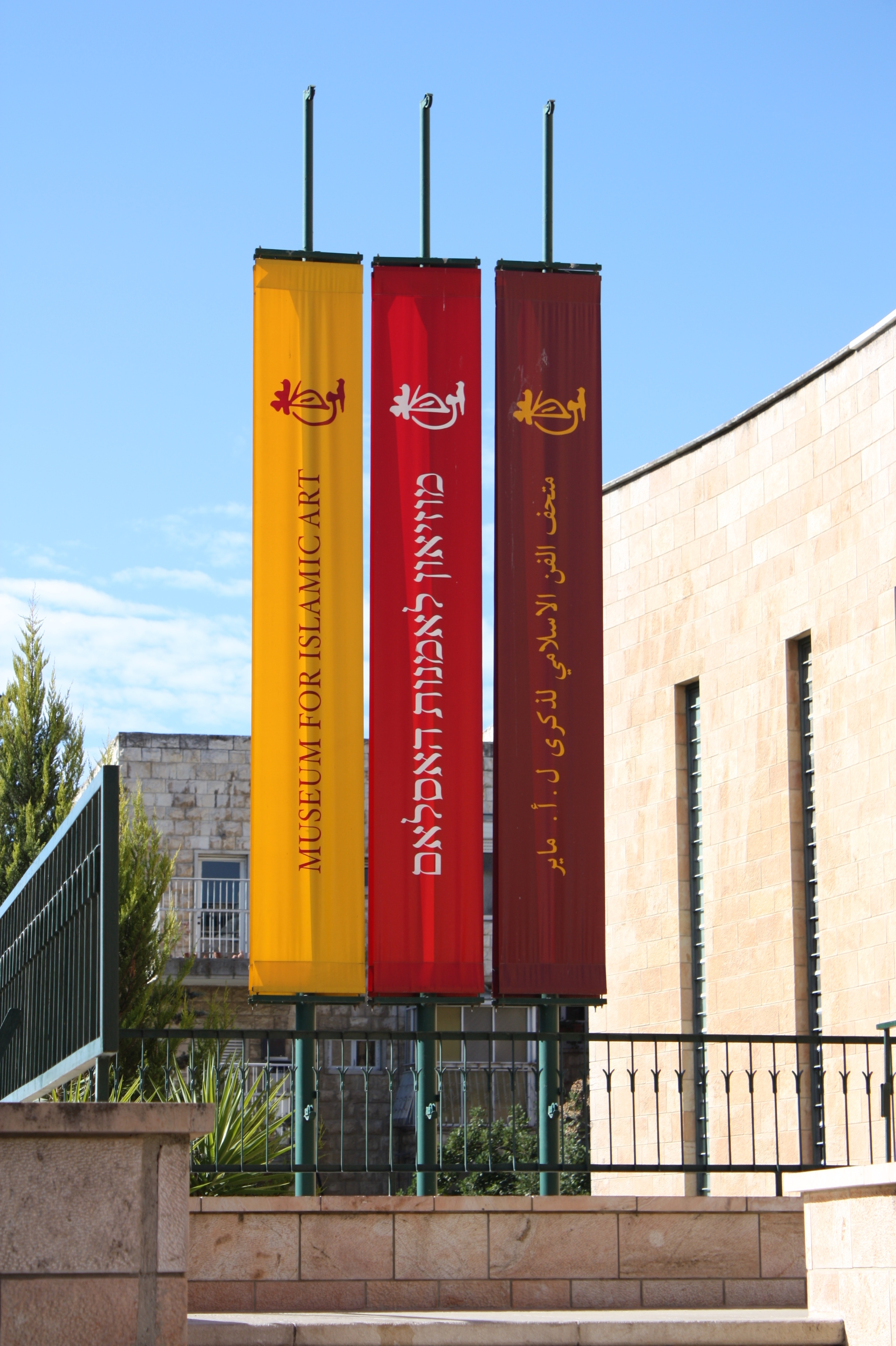
Trilingual museum sign

== Exhibitions ==
=== Contemporary Arab Art ===
In 2008, a group exhibit of contemporary Arab art opened at the Museum, the first show of local contemporary Arab art in an Israeli museum and the first to be mounted by an Arab curator. Thirteen Arab artists participated in the show.

=== Tastes of Heaven: Tales of the Arab Kitchen ===
In 2023–2024, the museum hosted an exhibition on the evolution of Arab cuisine from the 7th century CE to the Ottoman Empire, covering regions from Iraq to Spain. The exhibition included a variety of dishes, artwork, kitchenware, ceramics, and both copies and originals of ancient cookbooks, all related to the culinary history of Arabs and other groups living under Muslim rule.The exhibition was notably co-curated by Dr. Limor Yungman of the Hebrew University's Martin Buber Society of Fellows, in collaboration with Adi Namia Cohen.

== See also ==
- Islamic Museum, Jerusalem
- List of Islamic art museums
- List of Israeli museums
