= HaPalmach Street =

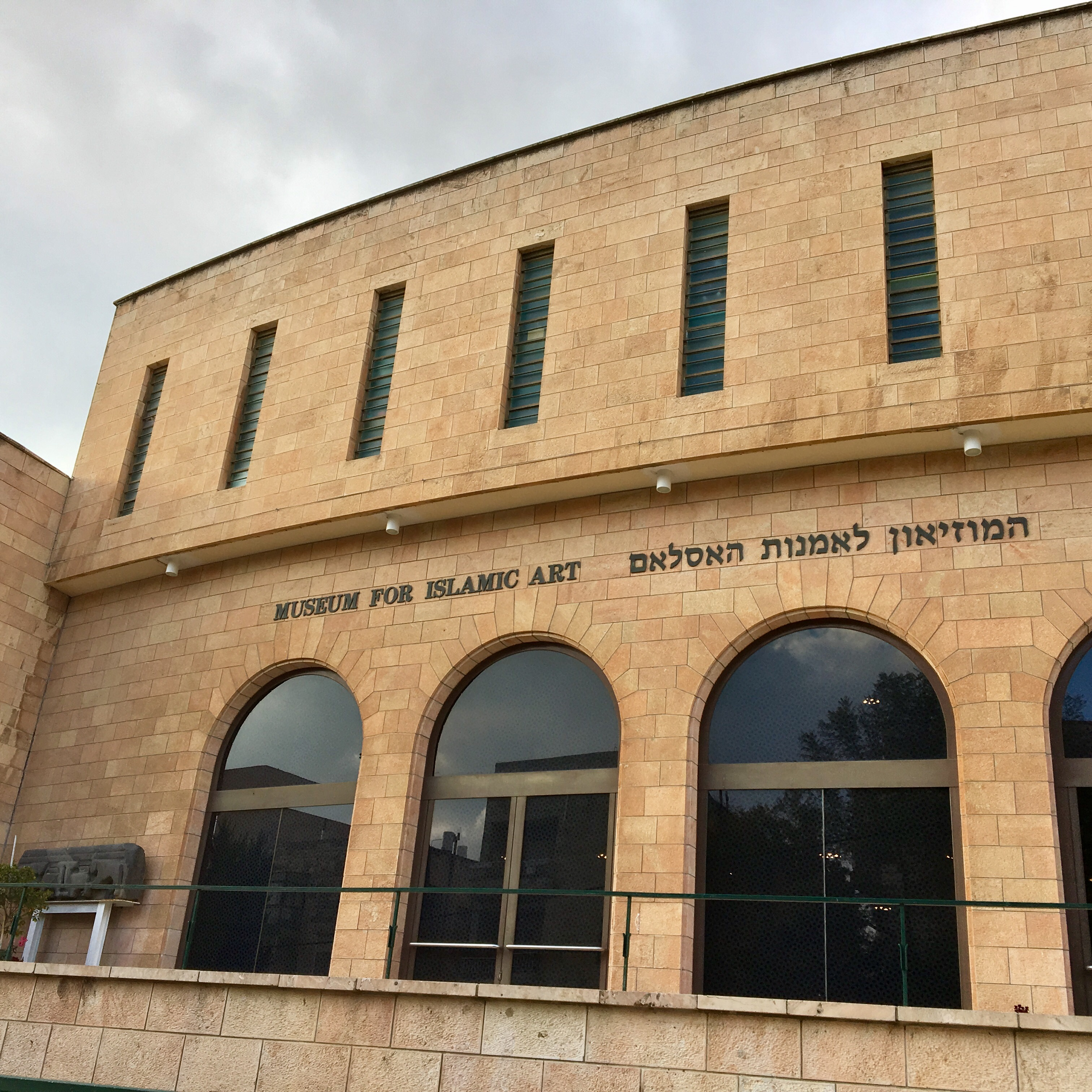
Islamic Museum on HaPalmach Street

HaPalmach (Hebrew: הפלמ"ח) is a street in the Katamon neighborhood of Jerusalem.

== History ==
The street is named for the Palmach paramilitary forces (acronym for plugot makhatz, or shock troops) in Mandatory Palestine.

Folke Bernadotte was assassinated on HaPalmach street in 1948.

Notable buildings on the street include the L. A. Mayer Institute for Islamic Art.
