= Rassco (company) =

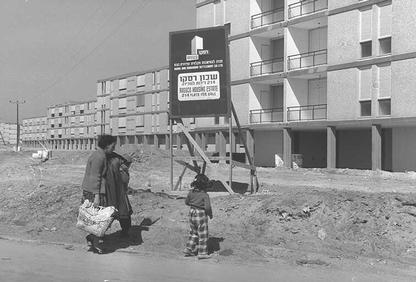
Shikun Rassco, Ashdod

Rassco (Rural and Suburban Settlement Company) is an Israeli construction and development company. It was established in Mandate Palestine 1934 at the initiative of the Jewish Agency.

== History ==
The company's initial goals were the establishment of agricultural settlements and industrial enterprises to assist in the absorption of German Jewish immigrants. Rassco was intended to be the central instrument for middle-class settlement and housing in Palestine.

The founders were Yeshayahu Foerder, Georg Landauer, Ludwig Pinner, Arthur Ruppin and David Senator. Chaim Weizmann, later Israel's first president, was the first chairman of the board.

The company built residential neighborhoods all over Israel, including the Rassco neighborhood in Jerusalem that bears its name.

In the 1950s, Rassco was listed on the Tel Aviv Stock Exchange. In the 1960s, Rassco built large-scale housing projects in Iran. In 1970, the Jewish Agency owned over 99 percent of the company shares and elected the entire board of directors.

Other enterprises run by Rassco include a metal factory, a prefabricated building company, a hotel and a health resort.

== See also ==
- Economy of Israel
