= Givat Oranim =

Neighborhood in Jerusalem

Givat Oranim גבעת אורנים
- Neighborhood
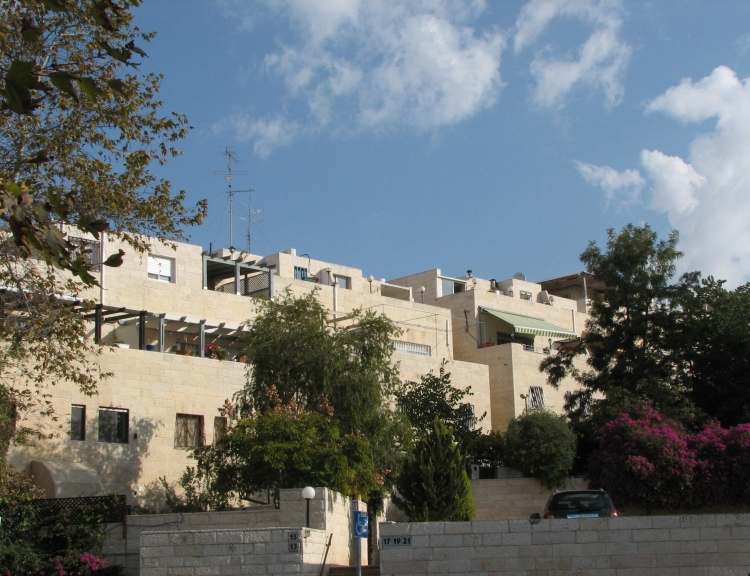
- Shai Agnon Boulevard, Givat Oranim

- Location in Jerusalem
- City: Jerusalem
- Established: After 1948

Givat Oranim (Hebrew: גבעת אורנים) is a neighborhood in southwestern Jerusalem, bordered by Katamon, Rassco, San Simon and Kiryat Shmuel.

== History ==
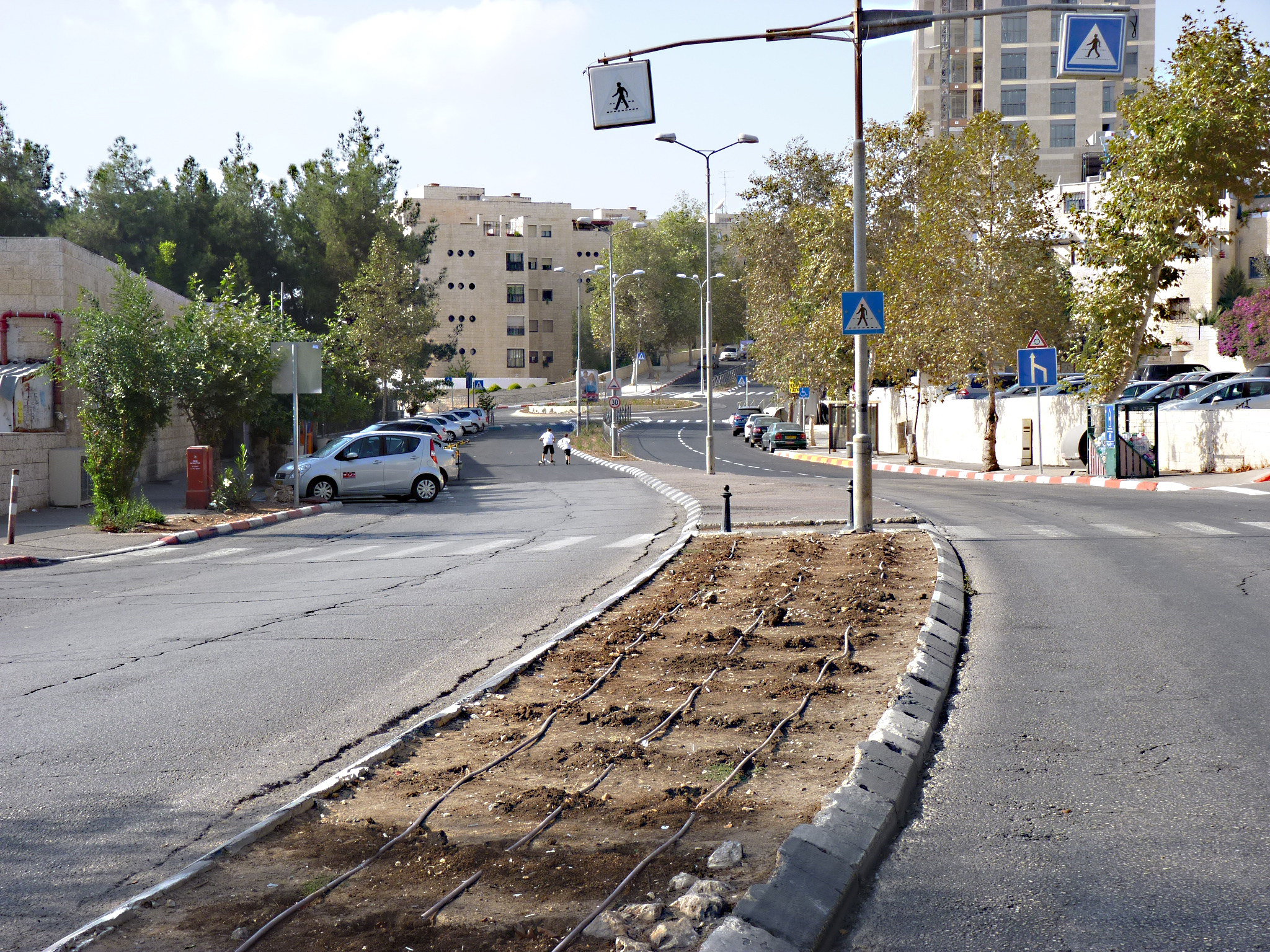
Shai Agnon Street

The construction of Givat Oranim began in 1978 by the Azorim company, below the San Simon Monastery, on land where part of the battle for the monastery took place during the War of Independence. The land was leased from the Greek Orthodox Patriarchate of Jerusalem, which had previously hosted the Zionist Youth Farm since 1950 and the Neve Horim nursing home since 1966. Some of the land in the area was purchased by businessman Chaim Schiff, who advanced development plans in partnership with Knesset member and businessman Yosef Kramerman, through his company Etz Lavid Industries and Investments. Writer and journalist Yehuda Elizur led opposition efforts against the construction plans, advocating for the preservation of the open space and the pine grove surrounding the monastery. Ultimately, a small portion of the grove south of the monastery was preserved and developed into a public park, "San Simon Park." Additionally, the District Planning and Building Committee canceled a plan to construct a 14-story tower that was intended to be part of the project.

The neighbourhood was populated in the early 1980s and was marketed as "the most desirable neighbourhood in the heart of Jerusalem," offering luxury apartments. The first phase included 78 duplex row houses with shared walls, the paving of Shai Agnon Boulevard, and the construction of a small commercial center with a few shops and a Co-Op Jerusalem supermarket. Subsequently, four-story apartment buildings were constructed, and in the mid-1980s, the "Makom BaTzameret" and "Ramat Salim" projects were built on the other side of Shai Agnon Boulevard, forming a continuous built-up area with the Rasko neighbourhood.

In this neighborhood there was an attempt to assassinate the left-wing activist, Zeev Sternhell, by putting a bomb on his apartment door.

== Notable residents ==
- Zeev Sternhell
