= Katamon =

Neighborhood in Jerusalem

Coordinates: 31.761°N 35.207°E

Katamon קטמון (Hebrew) قطمون (Arabic) Qatamon
- Neighborhood of Jerusalem
- Gonen
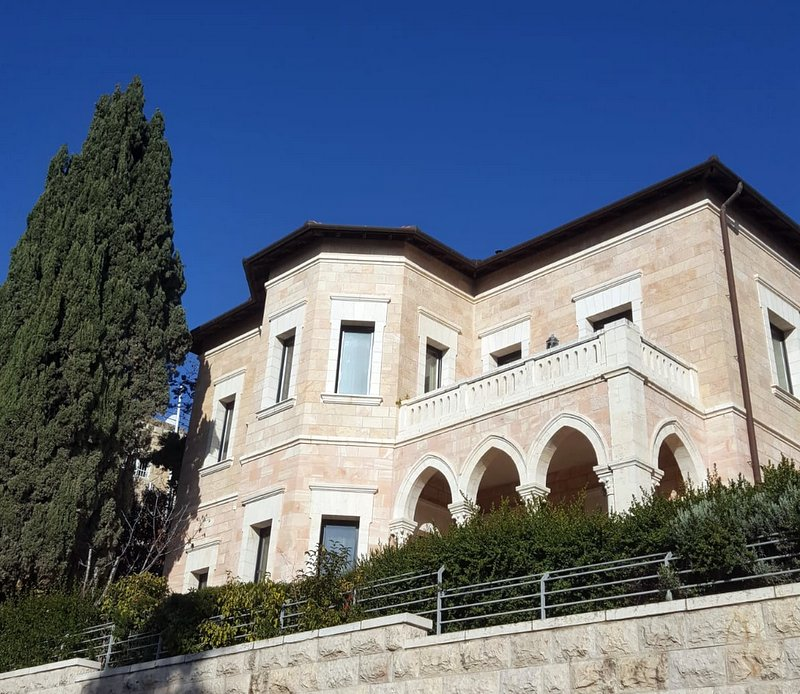
- House of Levi Eshkol
- Interactive map of Katamon
- Country: Israel
- District: Jerusalem District
- City: Jerusalem

Population (2017)
  - Total: 5,980

Katamon or Qatamon (Hebrew: קטמון; Arabic: قطمون, romanized: Qaṭamūn; Greek: Καταμόνας, romanized: Katamónas; from the Ancient Greek κατὰ τῷ μοναστηρίῳ, katà tôi monastēríōi, 'by the monastery'), officially known as Gonen (Hebrew: גּוֹנֵן, lit. 'Defender'; mainly used in municipal publications), is a neighborhood in south-central Jerusalem. It is built next to an old Greek Orthodox monastery, believed to have been constructed on the home and the tomb of Simeon from the Gospel of Luke.

The neighborhood was established in the early 1900s, shortly before World War I, as a wealthy, predominantly Palestinian Christian neighborhood. During the 1947–48 civil war in Mandatory Palestine, the local population fled the intense fighting in the area and were not allowed to return by the new Israeli state. Instead Katamon was soon repopulated by Jewish refugees.

== Geography ==
Katamon is bounded by the neighborhoods of Talbiya in the northeast and the German Colony and Greek Colony to the southeast. The neighbourhood is bounded on its south side by Rachel Imenu street and Hizkiyahu Ha'Melech street (separating it from the Greek Colony), and on its east side by Kovshey Katamon street (separating it from Talbiya). These streets connect to Emek Refaim and HaPalmach Street, respectively. During the British Mandate era, the neighborhood was divided into Upper Katamon and Lower Katamon.

=== Street names ===
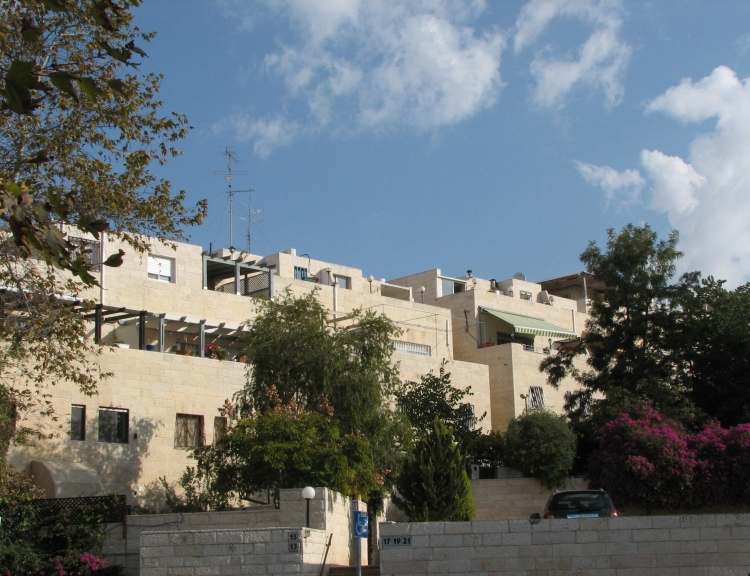
Givat Oranim, Katamon

During the British Mandate era the streets of Katamon had no names, with the exception of two: "Katamon" street (today known as "Rachel Imenu" and "Hizkiyahu HaMelech") and "Jorden" street (today known as "Tel Hai" street) which was nicknamed "Michael Sansour" street, after a wealthy contractor whose house was in the street. The buildings were not numbered and were named after the families who built them. After Israel's independence the streets were named based on subjects such as the 1948 war, biblical and rabbinic characters, and Zionist figures.

== History ==
=== Antiquity ===
From the late fourteenth century, the location of Katamon seem to have been identified with the home of Simeon from the Gospel of Luke, the Jerusalemite who first recognised the infant Jesus as "the Lord's Christ", i.e. the promised Messiah (Luke 2:25–32).

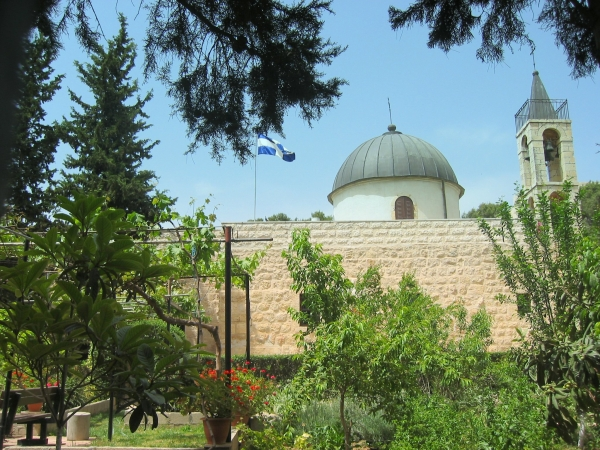
Greek Orthodox St. Simeon Monastery in Katamon

=== Ottoman era ===
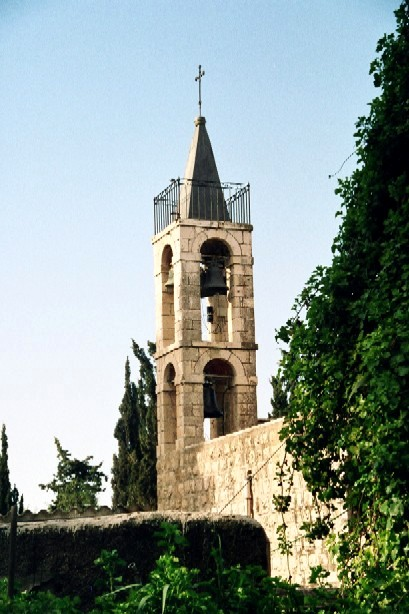
St. Simeon belltower

In 1524, after the Ottoman Turks conquered the region from the Mamluks, it was reported that a church of St. Simeon, previously held by the Georgians, was now empty in the wake of Muslim attacks. In 1681 Cornelis de Bruijn made an engraving of Jerusalem, which suggested that there was an L-shaped, four-story-high tower in Katamon, confirming an early seventeenth-century source which mentioned a "house and tower" of "Simeon the prophet". The Greek Orthodox acquired the site in 1859 and in 1881 they built there a new church and residence for their Patriarch, incorporating the older ruins. The Greek Orthodox call it "St. Symeon of Katamonas" and believe that it is built over the tomb of Simeon, with an inscription in a cave on the grounds interpreted to indicate that it was the tomb of Simeon's priestly forefathers. In 1890 the Greek–Orthodox patriarch Nicodemus I of Jerusalem built his summer house near the monastery (since the 1960s the building serves as a disabled care center).

The neighborhood began to develop in the late Ottoman era, in the early 1900s. According to Israeli geographer Gideon Biger, Katamon was probably planned before World War I. The lands in Katamon, like in nearby Talbiya and Baka, were owned by the Greek Orthodox Church of Jerusalem. In the late nineteenth century the church had a financial crisis which worsened during World War I. The Church sold, shortly before the war, some of its estate outside of the Old City, which were deemed as "less holy" including Katamon, which was split into plots for housing in a rural area.

Katamon lands. Fresh air and an affordable price. If you wish to become an owner of a plot in Katamon near the monastery, to which you arrive in a paved road and the area is divided into plots in the most pleasant way with roads and paths around, every plot is five-hundred square meters and the price for a plot is a thousand Qirsh and this amount can be paid in installments of five Qirsh per week, please take advantage of this opportunity and talk with Nacla Qatan and pay him five Qirsh and the plot will be yours. Provided, however, you will continue to pay this small amount. If you want to purchase more than one plot, you are allowed to do so and purchase additional plots. And when the raffle take place, you may win adjacent plots...

— A newspaper ad for Katamon, Falastin, 8 August 1914

German aerial photographs taken during the war show building lots demarcated by stones at Katamon in a grid plan way, and a system of dirt roads. Despite the low prices, the neighborhood did not attract Jewish buyers because the area was completely Christian, next to the Greek Colony, German Colony and Baka. Until the war five houses were built in Katamon.

=== British Mandate ===
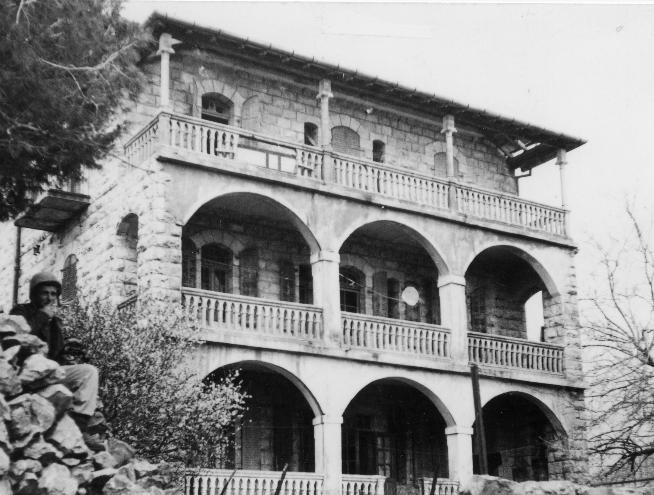
Templer architecture in Katamon

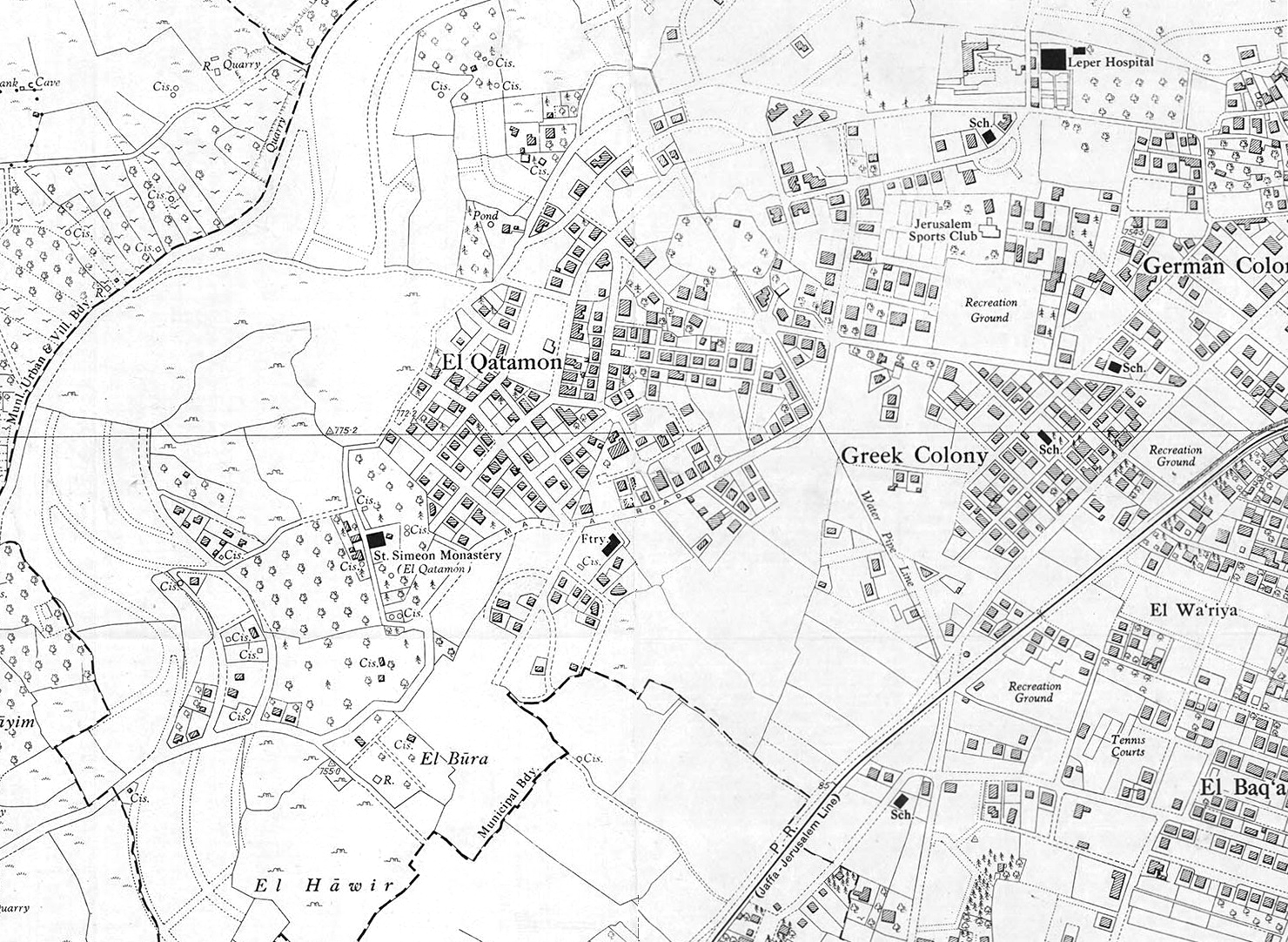
Katamon and its surroundings, 1947

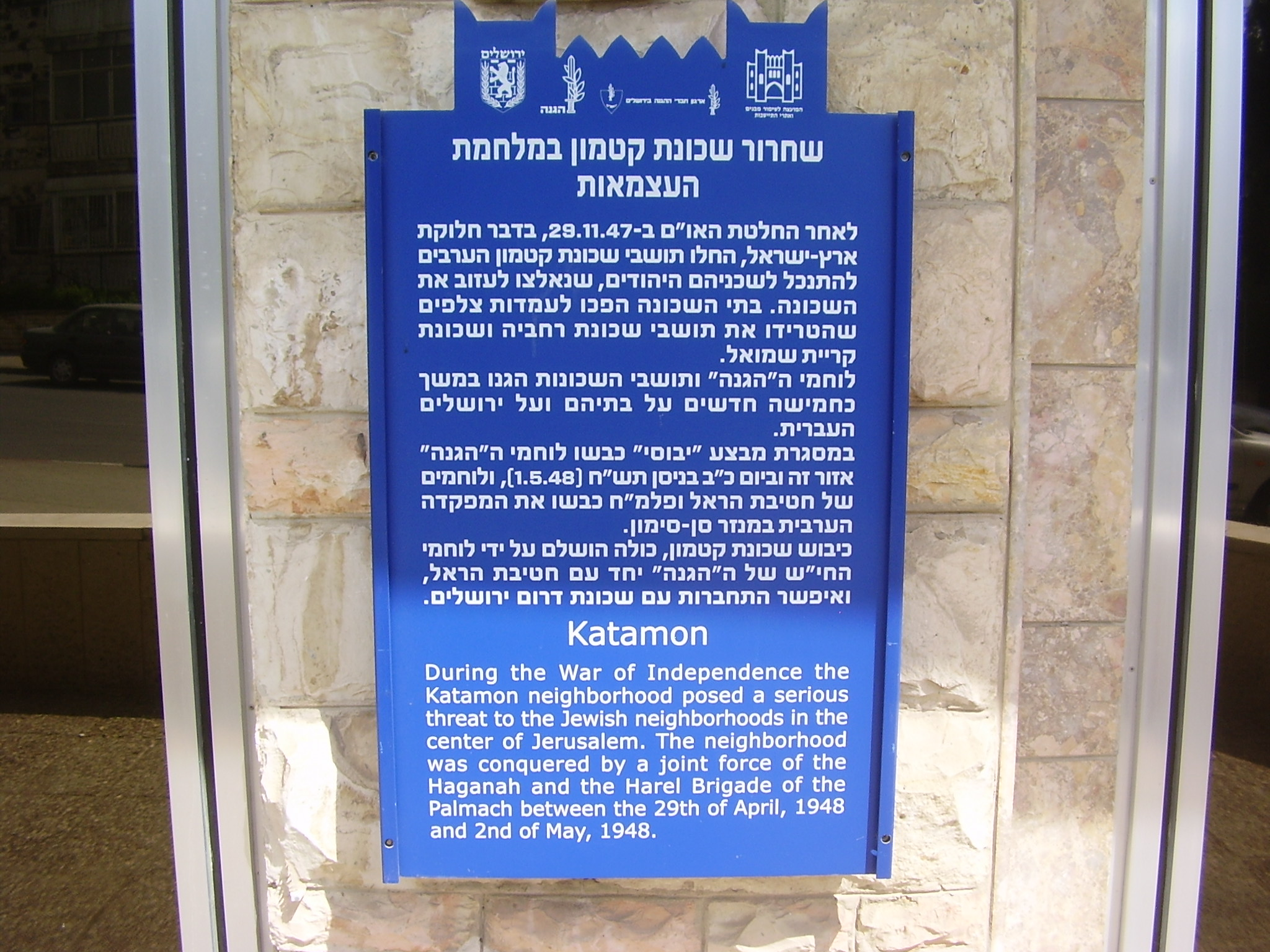
Katamon War memorial in Jerusalem

During the 1920s, some 90 new residential plots were planned in Katamon and their construction began shortly after the war, especially after 1924. In a short time, some 40 luxurious buildings were built in the neighborhood, by Christian–Arab families. The buildings were built in plan for different blocs and not for the entire neighborhood. About half of Katamon's buildings were built between 1927 and 1937, and the rest were built until 1948. Most of Katamon's residents were educators, teachers, businessmen, contractors, traders and other professionals from the upper and middle class. Along with private houses, apartment buildings were built for the purpose of rent.

The neighborhood developed into a prosperous, bourgeois neighborhood with a European–Cosmopolitan character whilst retaining the local, oriental culture. Most of the builders were Arab–Christians from the Greek–Orthodox community, headed by Issa Michael al-Toubbeh, but among them were some Latin rite Catholics (some from an Italian origin) and Armenian Protestants. A phenomenon which contributed to the neighborhood's cosmopolitan character was intermarriage between different Christian communities. The apartments were rented to Arab people and British officials, army officers and their families, who preferred to live in a Christian neighborhood.

Most of the children were sent to high quality and expensive schools, usually private ones. The schools teaching languages were usually English, Italian, German or French.

The members of the Greek–Orthodox community lived a secular lifestyle, visiting churches only on holidays and family events. They used to pray in the church of the San Simon Monastery, the church of the Monastery of the Cross or in churches in the Christian Quarter of the Old City. The Latin rite Catholic community made their prayer at the Chapel of St. Theresa in Katamon or in churches located in the Old City. Protestant families conducted their prayer at the St. George's Cathedral or in the Old City.

Many of the residents worked in British public services and many were members of YMCA. Many consulates were established in the neighborhood including the consulates of Lebanon, Egypt, Syria, Iraq, Italy (which remains the consulates of Italy in Israel today), Belgium, Poland and Czechoslovakia. Three small hotels and a pension existed in the neighborhood before 1948 and there was a British sports club in the neighborhood, which was later used by Hapoel Jerusalem football club for a few years.

=== 1948 war ===
The neighborhood was an Arab neighborhood between two Jewish neighborhoods and the only one in a line of Jewish neighborhoods.

According to Benny Morris, Katamon was largely abandoned by its residents during the 1948 Palestine war. The evacuation of Arabs was reported already on 10 December, and British assistance to the evacuation was reported on the beginning of January. The neighbourhood's handful of Jewish inhabitants left during the war's first weeks. According to Israeli historian Benny Morris, they left either out of fear or under Arab intimidation.

On the night of 5–6 January 1948, the Semiramis Hotel was bombed by the Haganah in Katamon, killing 24-26. After the attack many Arab residents of the neighborhood began fleeing, most of them were women, children and elders. Most fled to the Old City and some fled to the southern part of Qatamon which was around the Iraqi consulate defended by the Jordanian Arab Legion. Some of the middle-class residents found refuge in Bethlehem. The Arab authorities tried to stem the flight and many young men who fled to the Old City returned to Qatamon. Hala al-Sakakini, the daughter of Palestinian scholar and poet Khalil al-Sakakini and a resident of Katamon, described in her diary how frightened residents fled their homes and did not respond to the orders to remain. By March only a few families remained in the neighborhood, guarded by irregular forces based on San Simon Monastery.

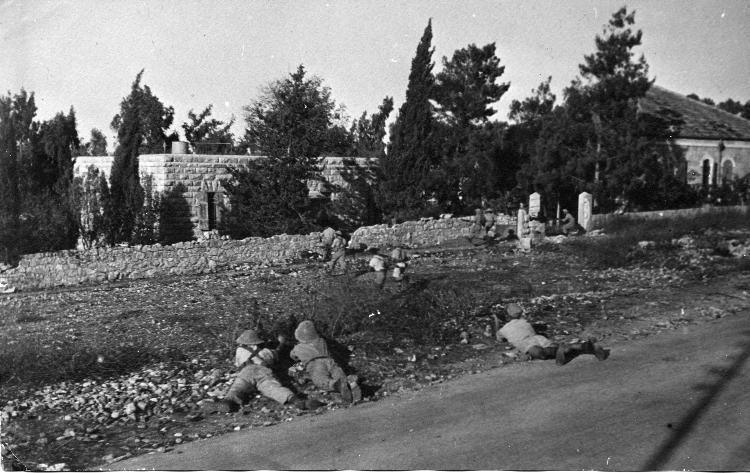
Harel Brigade during the attack on Katamon, 1948

During the war, attacks by the Arab side originated from the Greek Orthodox Saint Simeon Monastery in Katamon that was located in a strategic point overlooking the Jewish neighborhoods. On mid April the Jewish leadership halted Operation Harel near Jerusalem and ordered the Harel Brigade to deploy in the city and conduct Operation Yevusi. The reason behind the order was false reports of a fast British evacuation from the city and that the Arabs are deploying large forces in the city in order to fill the vacuum. In the battle over Katamon, which was centered around the St. Simeon monastery, most of the Arab fighters in the city participated, after they were called upon by the local militia. Fighters from the nearby Arab villages refused to send support, claiming they needed to defend themselves. The commander of the Arab forces, Ibrahim Abu-Dayyeh^{(he)}, was one of the prominent Arab commanders and earned respect due to his involvement during the battle over the Nabi Daniel Convoy and the battle over Sheikh Jarrah. His men were equipped with light weapons and homemade armoured vehicles as well as ones looted from the battle of Nabi Daniel. Against them were the Jewish fighters of the fourth battalion of the Harel Brigade, who were exhausted from the constant fighting in earlier battles. During the fights both sides suffered from total exhaustion. The Arabs called on the Jordanian Arab Legion to intervene but they refused. When the Arabs saw no reinforcement will arrive they decided to halt their attack and withdrew, letting to Jews take the neighborhood.

Historian Saleh Abdel Jawad wrote that "indiscriminate killings" occurred on 29 April after the neighborhood was captured by the Haganah. (Note: Saleh Abdel Jawad, 2007, Zionist Massacres: the Creation of the Palestinian Refugee Problem in the 1948 War. "29 April 1948: Jerusalem, Qatamoun neighbourhood: Indiscriminate killings occur. After the fall of this western neighbourhood in Jerusalem, the Haganah forces kill an unknown number of people.")

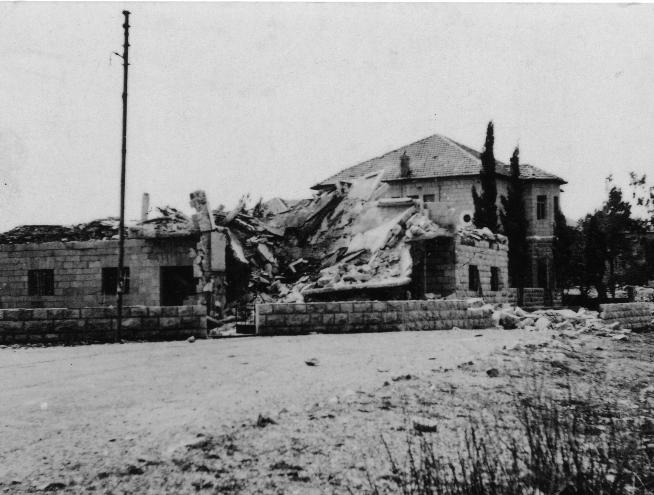
Destruction in Katamon after Operation Yevusi

The loss of the neighborhood was followed by massive looting by Jewish soldiers and civilians alike. Hagit Shlonsky, who lived nearby, wrote

For days you could see people walking by carrying looted goods. ... Not only soldiers, civilians as well. They were looting like mad. They were even carrying dining tables.

Approximately 30,000 books, newspapers and manuscripts were collected by the National Library of Israel from Katamon and the other Arab neighborhoods. They were initially catalogued under their owners' names, but were later reclassified as "abandoned property".

On September 17, 1948, UN Mediator Folke Bernadotte and UN Observer André Serot, were assassinated by members of the Jewish Lehi organisation while being driven along Palmach Street, opposite the junction with Ha'gdud Ha'ivri Street, in Katamon.

=== Israeli period and resettlement ===
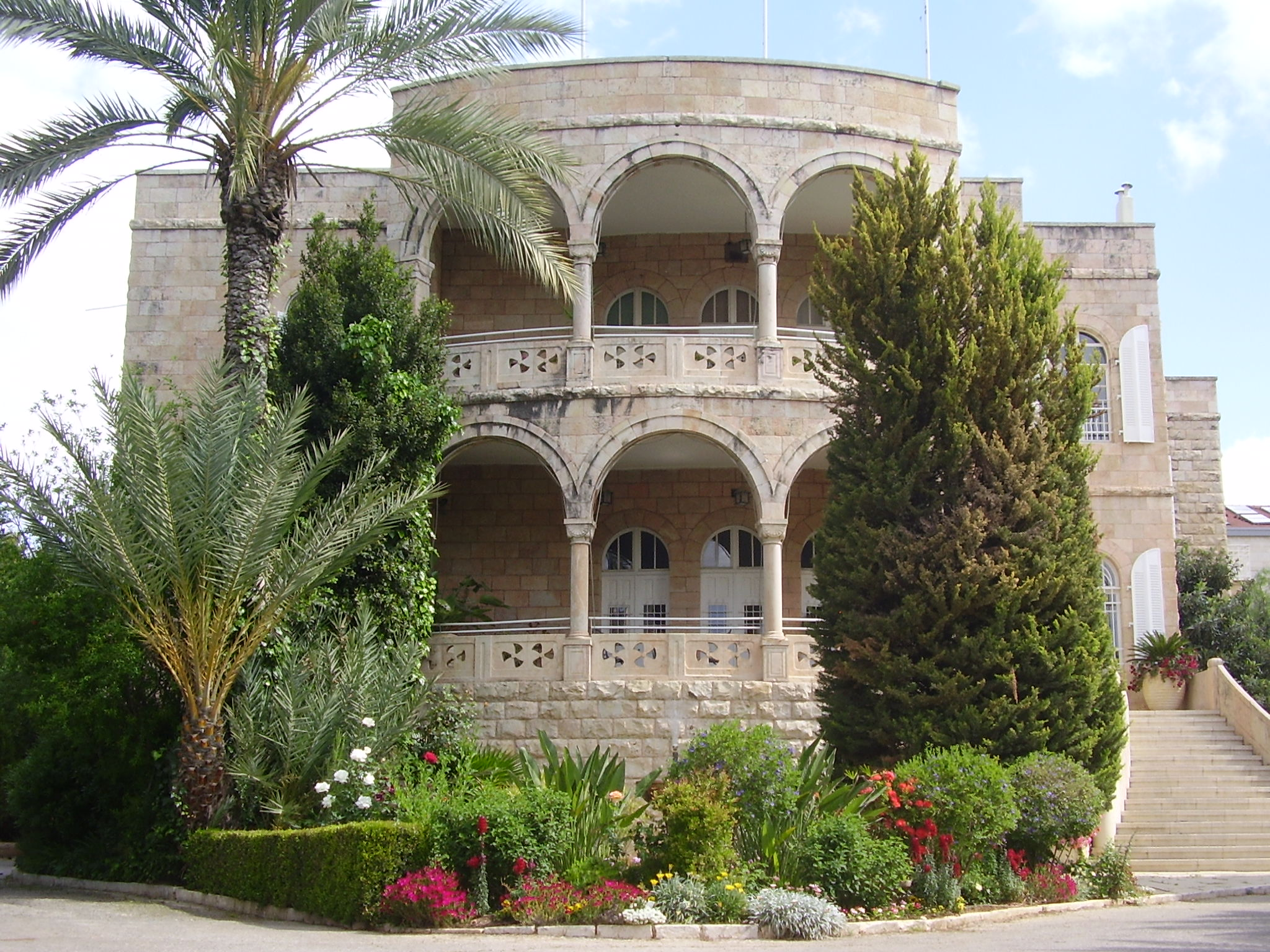
Villa Cherkessi, Katamon

During May–June, some 1,400 Jews, consisting of women, children, elders and wounded were expelled from the Jewish Quarter of the Old City by the Jordanian Arab Legion after it fell on 28 May. Some were settled in houses in Katamon, abandoned by its Arab owners. The neighborhood was also temporarily settled with Jewish women and children from front-line kibbutzim in the Jerusalem corridor. The abandoned neighborhood, as well as other evacuated Arab neighborhoods were looted by the displaced Jews and Israeli soldiers who entered empty Arab houses, a phenomenon that the Jewish authorities failed to halt, usually turning a blind eye to it. This phenomenon was condemned by Israeli politician Dov Yosef, for ethical and moral reason, as well as practical reasons. The looters also took door and window frames, and taps, which made the relocation of refugees more difficult.

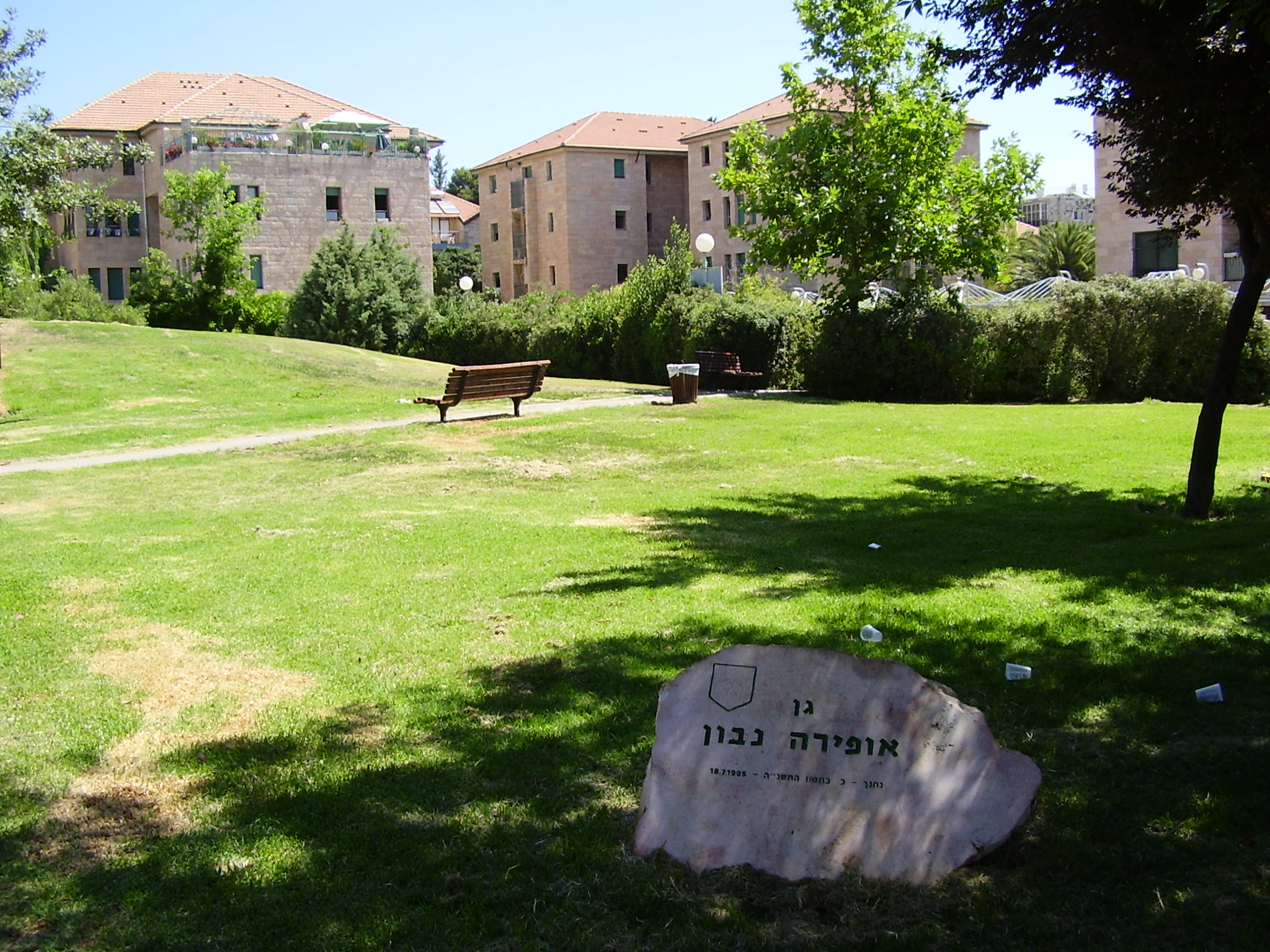
Ofira Navon park, built on the site of Katamon football stadium

Jewish immigrants and government officials joined the Old City's refugees and settled in Katamon after the war. In order to allow as many people to live in the neighborhood, the apartments were divided into smaller units. In buildings which housed one family, three or four new families were settled. Because of the difficulties, unauthorized renovations and improvised extensions made by the residents.

Some of Katamon's buildings were designated for public needs, such as synagogues, schools, kindergartens and places for elders. One of the apartment buildings was used as a new location to the Misgav Ladach hospital, originally from the Old City.

== Architecture ==
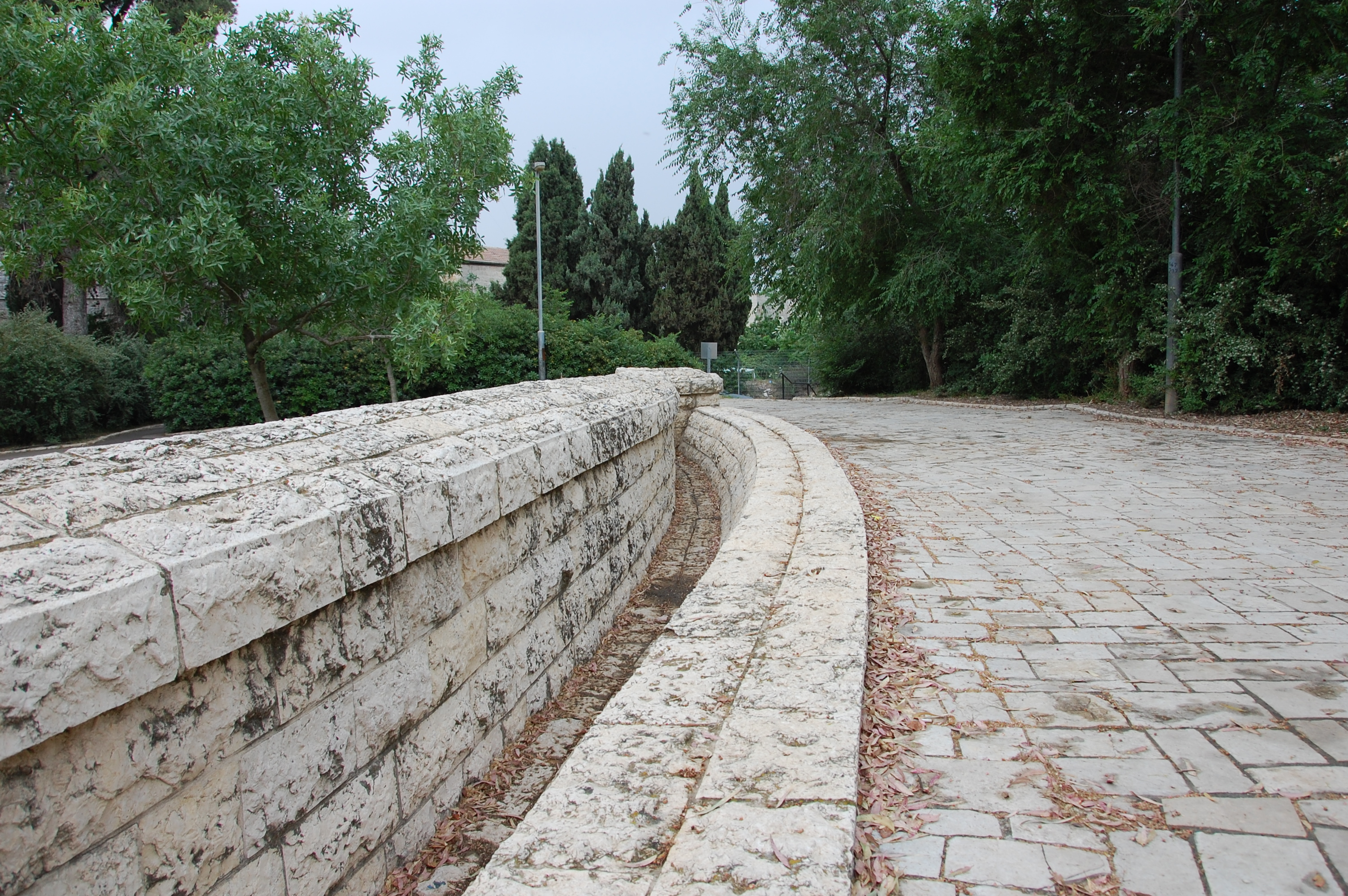
San Simon Park

In the early 1950s, many public housing projects were built in Katamon, often using the Wild Bau cladding style - a random rubble masonry pattern - which was adopted by modernist architects in Jerusalem.

== Gentrification ==
In the early 1970s, a process of gentrification began in Katamon when people of the middle class bought the apartments where low class residents lived and started renovating them, reuniting the apartments that were split after 1948 and overall raising the standards of the houses. Katamon attracted many people because of the character of its small "Arab styled" houses, with yards, stone walls and gates, porches, tiled roofs and stylized floors, located close to the city's center. The neighborhood had a slow process of population change and social and physical renewal. The conservative and semi-rural character attracted, mainly after the 1980s, families of Jewish immigrants, mostly wealthy religious ones from western countries, who were able to purchase and renovate the houses.

Since the 1970s, the neighborhood, which was populated mostly by secular and masorti Jews, has also been having a process of Haredization, including the construction of apartment blocks for Haredi Jews.

== Landmarks ==
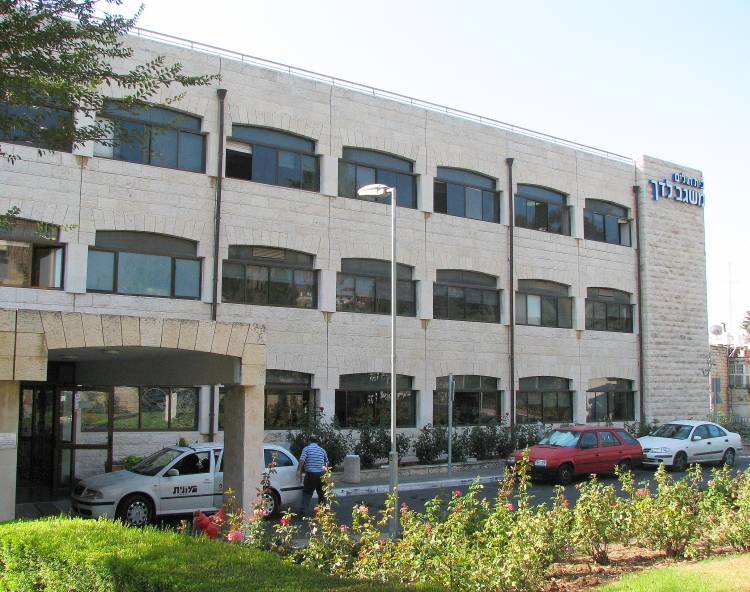
Misgav Ladach Hospital

A major landmark in Katamon is the Saint Simeon monastery, known to Jerusalemites as San Simon^{(he)}, on a hilltop to the north. The monastery is now surrounded by a large park known as San Simon in the neighborhood Givat Oranim.

In the center of the neighborhood lies the Recha Freier square. Around the square are five historical buildings that were used for the embassies and foreign consulates of Lebanon (during the British era only), Poland, Venezuela, El Salvador, Belgium and Greece. The Greek consulate remains there since the 1950s as the Greek consulate in Jerusalem.

Katamon is also home to the Israel Goldstein Youth Village^{(he)}, which has a number of school programs (boarding and day schools), especially for Russian and French Olim. Also in the Youth Village is Ramah Israel, which hosts teens from North America through the Ramah Seminar program for 6 weeks in the summer and Tichon Ramah Yerushalayim (Ramah Jerusalem High School) for 4.5 months in the Spring.

Katamon was the home of several foreign consulates, among them the Greek consulate, the Italian consulate, and the Costa-Rican consulate. The old Hapoel stadium was purchased by developers and is now the site of the upscale Ganei Katamon neighborhood, ringing Ofira Navon park.

The Misgav Ladach hospital on the southern edge of the neighbourhood specialized in maternity care, but is now a medical center for Kupat Holim Meuhedet. The Museum for Islamic Art is located on Palmach Street in Katamon. Katamon also houses the core community of Erlau Hassidism, as well its yeshiva, Ohel Shimon. The International Christian Embassy Jerusalem has been based in Katamon since 1997.

== Katamonim ==
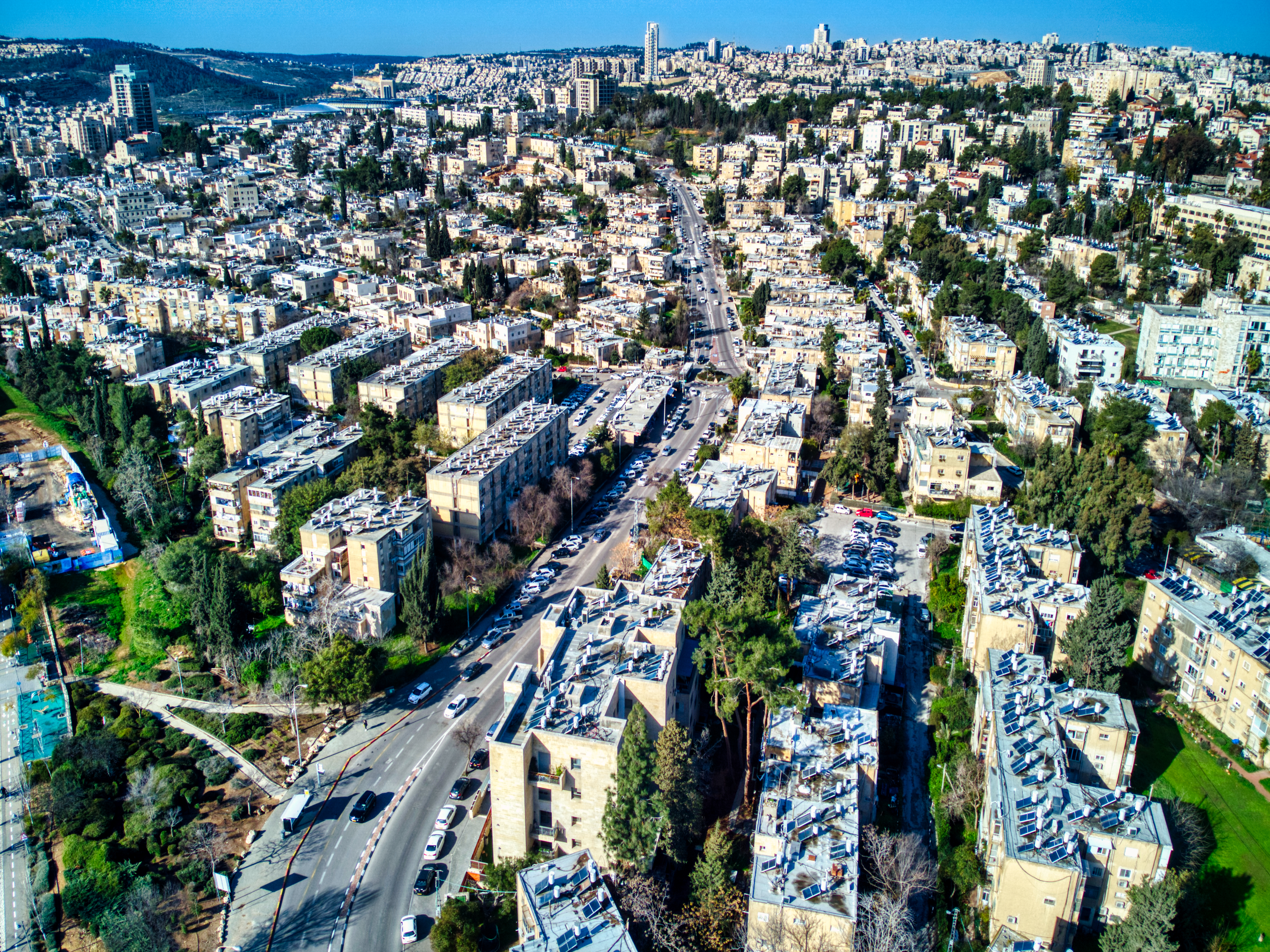
Katamonim

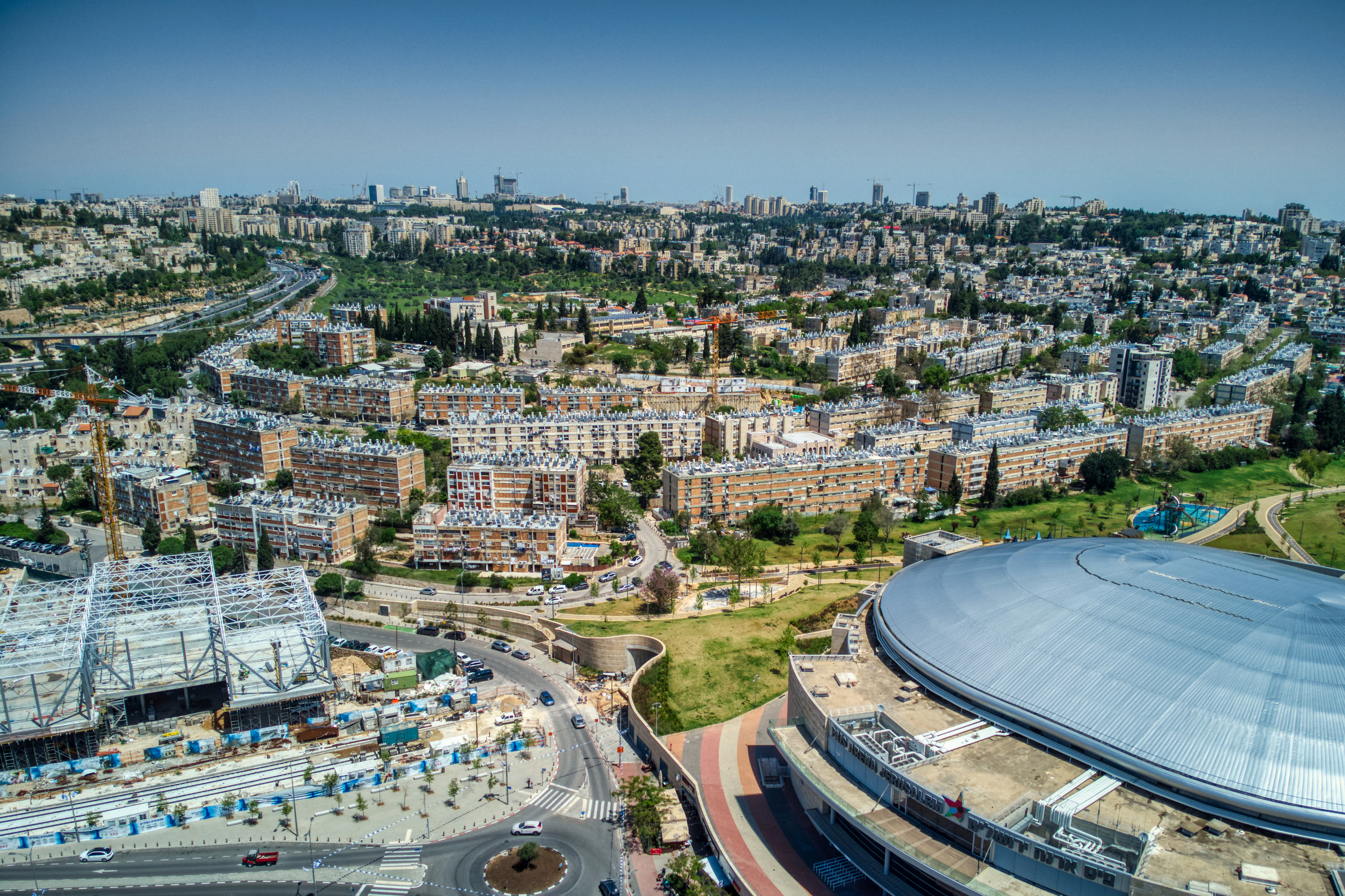
Housing project, Katamon Tet

To the west, Old Katamon branches out into several neighborhoods collectively called the "Katamonim" (plural of Katamon; officially Gonenim, lit. "Defenders"), built in the early years of the state to accommodate the large wave of new immigrants from Iraq and Kurdistan, previously living in tent camps. These neighborhoods were assigned Hebrew numerals : Katamon Khet ("Katamon 8"), Katamon Tet ("Katamon 9), etc. Some of those neighborhoods have a second name. Katamon Hei (5) is also called San Simon Neighborhood, a part of Katamon Het (8) and Katamon tet (9) is sometimes called San Martin Neighborhood, and Katamon zayn (7) is Pat neighborhood.

Katamon Khet was built at the end of the 1950s, and Katamon Tet in the mid-1960s. The Katamonim are characterized by long apartment blocks on pillars, providing low-cost housing. Some of the buildings are still government-owned, although the Amidar housing company sold many of the apartments to the residents in the 1970s. The neighborhood hosts a well-known WIZO community center called after Helena Kagan.

Prior to the Six-Day War in June 1967, the Katamonim were on the Jordanian-Israeli armistice line. Massive infrastructure improvement was financed by an urban renewal project known as "Project Renewal" over a period of two decades. Many small apartments were combined into larger ones and the outward appearance of the apartment blocks was improved. Since the 1990s, many Russian and Ethiopian immigrants have been given housing there.

== Sports ==
The neighbourhood was home to the Hapoel Jerusalem football club from the 1930s until it moved back to the YMCA Stadium in the 1980s. In 2007, Hapoel Jerusalem fans formed a new club, naming it Hapoel Katamon Jerusalem after the club's former home, although the new club does not play in the neighborhood. The Jerusalem Tennis Center, founded in 1981 and dedicated in 1982 by the Jewish community of South Africa in memory of Yossi Zeituni, a tennis coach who fell in the Lebanon War, is located in the Katamonim. The center has 19 courts and a stadium with seating for 2,000 spectators.

== Popular culture ==
The 2008–2012 Israeli television drama Srugim takes place in Katamon.

== Notable residents ==
- Levi Eshkol, former Prime Minister of Israel
- Benjamin Netanyahu, Prime Minister of Israel
- Benzion Netanyahu, historian
- Aliza Olmert, artist
- Ehud Olmert, former Prime Minister of Israel
- Julia Glushko, tennis player
- Eden Alene, singer
- Sami Hadawi
- Ghada Karmi
- Hasan Karmi
- Khalil al-Sakakini
- David Rubinger, photographer and photojournalist
- Meir Shalev, writer and newspaper columnist
- Amichai Chasson, poet and filmmaker
- Trude Dothan, archaeologist
- Shaul Tchernichovsky, poet
- Shulamith Hareven, author and essayist
- Gail Hareven, author
- Yehuda Bacon, artist
- Professor Gerald M. Steinberg, academic and political activist

== Bibliography ==
- Bruyn, Le, C. (1725). Voyage au Levant: c'est-à-dire, dans les principaux endroits de l'Asie Mineure, dans les isles de Chio, Rhodes, Chypre, etc., de même que dans les plus considérables villes d'Egypte, de Syrie, et Terre Sainte (in French). Vol. 3. Paris: chez Jean Baptiste Claude Bauche, le fils, Quay des Augustins, a Saint Jean dans le desert.
- Karmi, G.: In Search of Fatima: A Palestinian Story ISBN 1-85984-694-7 Verso 2002
- A country of the mind Guardian, Saturday October 19, 2002 (from Dr Ghada Karmi's memoir, In Search of Fatima)
- Pringle, D. (1998). The Churches of the Crusader Kingdom of Jerusalem: A-K (excluding Acre and Jerusalem). Vol. II. Cambridge University Press. ISBN 0 521 39037 0.
- Pringle, D. (2009). The Churches of the Crusader Kingdom of Jerusalem: The cities of Acre and Tyre with Addenda and Corrigenda to Volumes I-III. Vol. IV. Cambridge University Press. ISBN 978-0-521-85148-0. (p. 245)
- Morris, B. (2004). The Birth of the Palestinian Refugee Problem Revisited. Cambridge University Press. ISBN 978-0-521-00967-6.
- Gelber, Y. (2004) "Independence Versus Nakba"; Kinneret Zmora-Bitan Dvir Publishing, ISBN 965-517-190-6
- Sakakini, Hala: Jerusalem and I, 1987
- Kroyanker, D. (2002). Jerusalem Neighborhoods: Talbiyeh, Katamon and the Greek Colony (in Hebrew). Keter Publishing House.
