= Santiago Calatrava =

Spanish-Swiss engineer and architect (born 1951)

Santiago Calatrava Valls
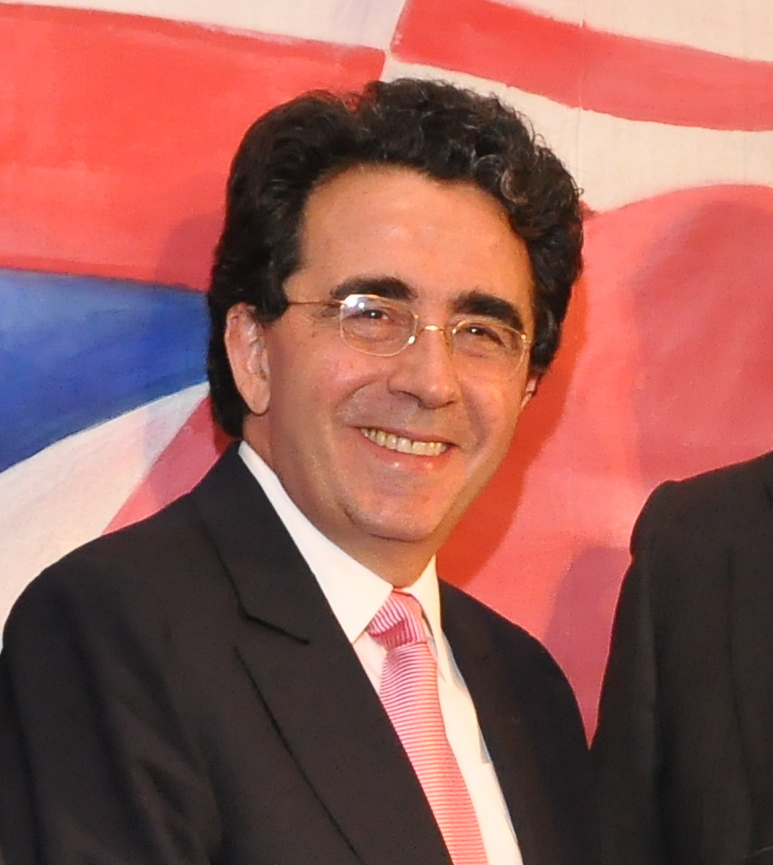
- Calatrava in 2010
- Born: 28 July 1951 (age 75); Valencia, Spain
- Education: Polytechnic University of Valencia; Swiss Federal Institute of Technology
- Engineering career
- Discipline: Structural engineer, Architect, sculptor
- Institutions: Institution of Structural Engineers
- Practice name: Santiago Calatrava
- Projects: Turning Torso; Athens Olympic Sports Complex; Auditorio de Tenerife; Alamillo bridge Chords Bridge; Ciutat de les Arts i les Ciències; Liège-Guillemins railway station Museum of Tomorrow; World Trade Center station (PATH); Dubai Creek Tower; St. Nicholas Greek Orthodox Church (Manhattan)
- Awards: European Prize for Architecture; AIA Gold Medal; IStructE Gold Medal; Eugene McDermott Award; Prince of Asturias Award; Auguste Perret Prize

Santiago Calatrava Valls (born 28 July 1951) is a Spanish-Swiss architect, structural engineer, sculptor and painter, particularly known for his bridges supported by single leaning pylons, and his railway stations, stadiums, and museums, whose sculptural forms often resemble living organisms. His works include the Olympic Sports Complex of Athens, the Milwaukee Art Museum, the Turning Torso tower in Malmö, Sweden, the World Trade Center Transportation Hub in New York City, the Auditorio de Tenerife in Santa Cruz de Tenerife, the Margaret Hunt Hill Bridge in Dallas, Texas, and his largest project, the City of Arts and Sciences and Opera House in his birthplace, Valencia. His architectural firm has offices in New York City, Doha, and Zurich.

== Early life ==
Calatrava was born on 28 July 1951, in Benimàmet, an old municipality now part of Valencia, Spain. His Calatrava surname was an old aristocratic one from medieval times, and was once associated with an order of knights in Spain. He had his primary and secondary schooling in Valencia, and, beginning in 1957, studied drawing and painting at the School of Applied Art. In 1964, as the regime of General Francisco Franco relaxed and Spain became more open to the rest of Europe, he went to France as an exchange student. In 1968, after completing secondary school, he went to study at the Ecole des Beaux Arts in Paris, but he arrived in the midst of student uprisings and turmoil in Paris, and returned home. Back in Valencia, he discovered a book about the architecture of Le Corbusier, which persuaded him that he could be both an artist and an architect. He enrolled in the Higher School of Architecture at the Polytechnic University of Valencia. He received his diploma as an architect and then did higher studies in urbanism. At the university he completed independent projects with fellow students, publishing two books on the vernacular architecture of Valencia and Ibiza.

In 1975, he enrolled in the Swiss Federal Institute of Technology in Zurich, Switzerland for a second degree in civil engineering. In 1981, he was awarded a doctorate in the department of architecture, after completing his thesis on "The Pliability of three-dimensional structures." Speaking of this period, Calatrava told biographer Philip Jodidio:"The desire to start all over at zero was very strong in me. I was fascinated by the concept of gravity and convinced that it was necessary to begin work with simple forms." Calatrava explained that he was particularly influenced by the work of the early 20th century Swiss engineer Robert Maillart (1872–1940), which taught him that, "with an adequate combination of force and mass, you can create emotion."

== First projects and international attention ==
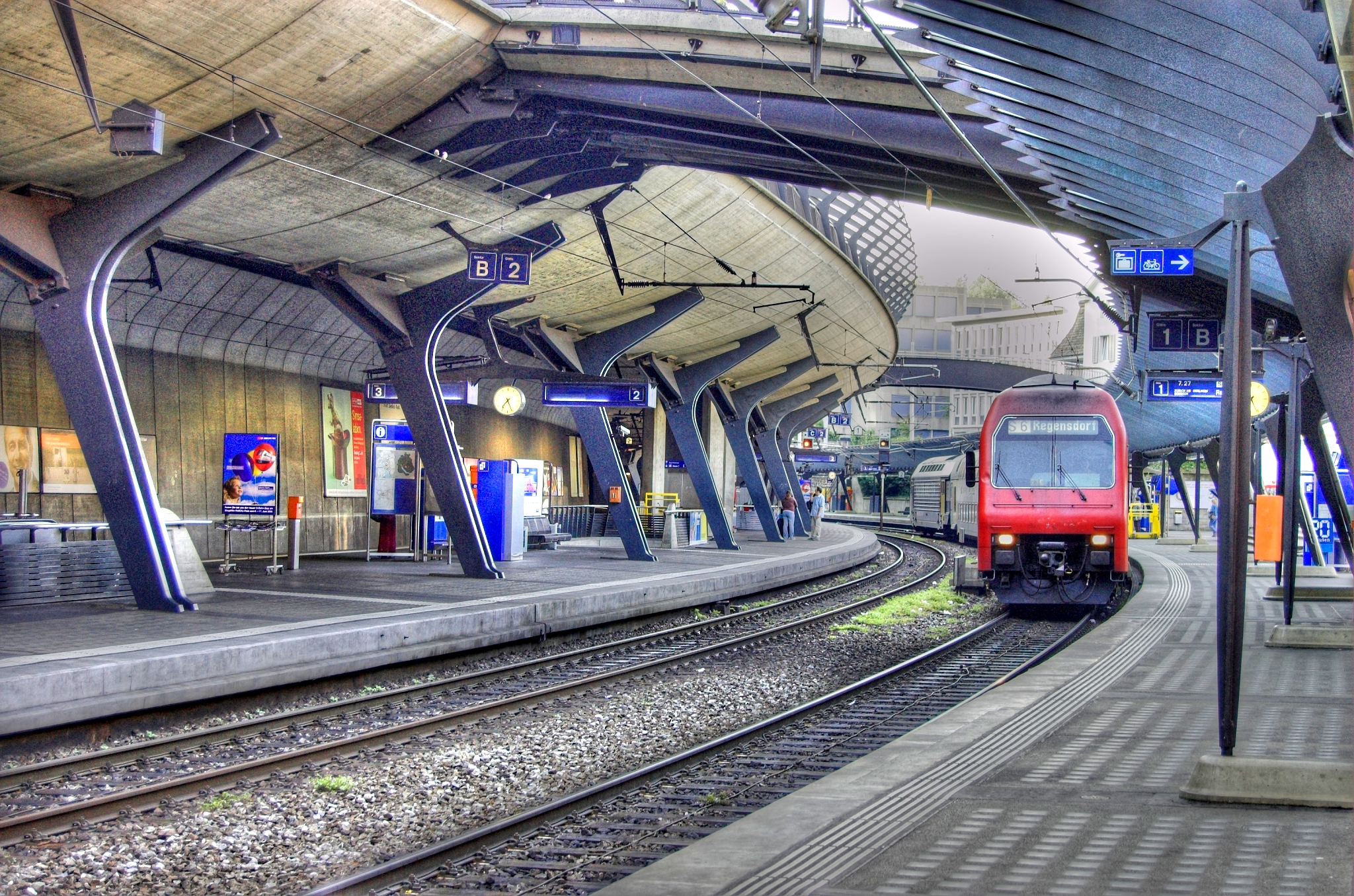
Zürich Stadelhofen railway station in Zurich. Switzerland (1983–90)

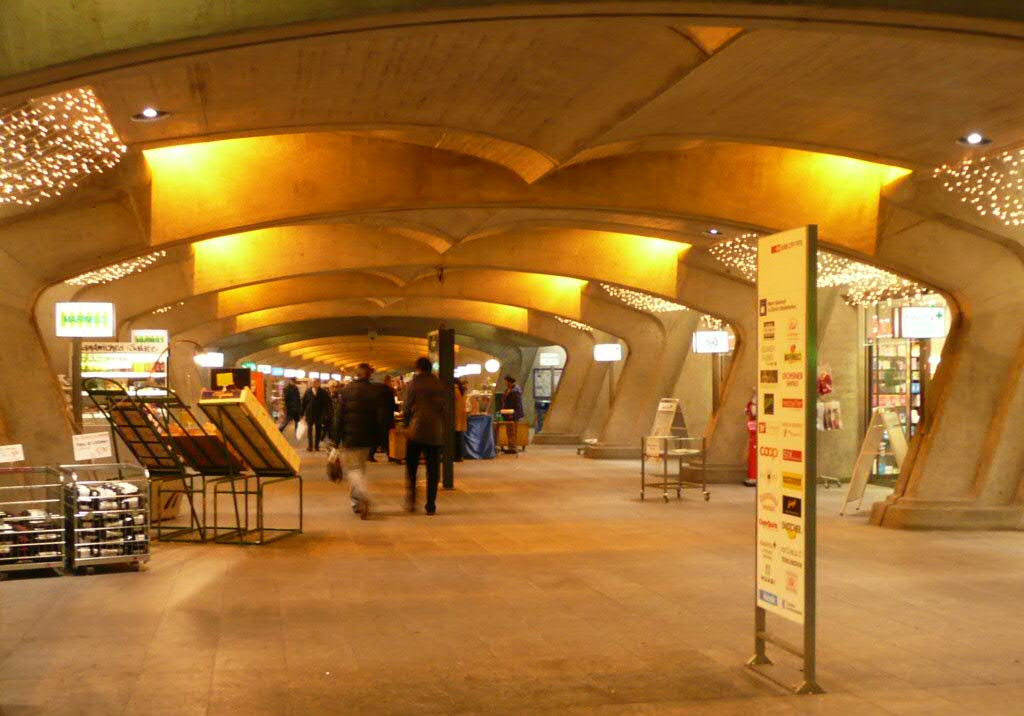
Interior of the Zürich Stadelhofen railway station in Zurich. Switzerland (1983–90)

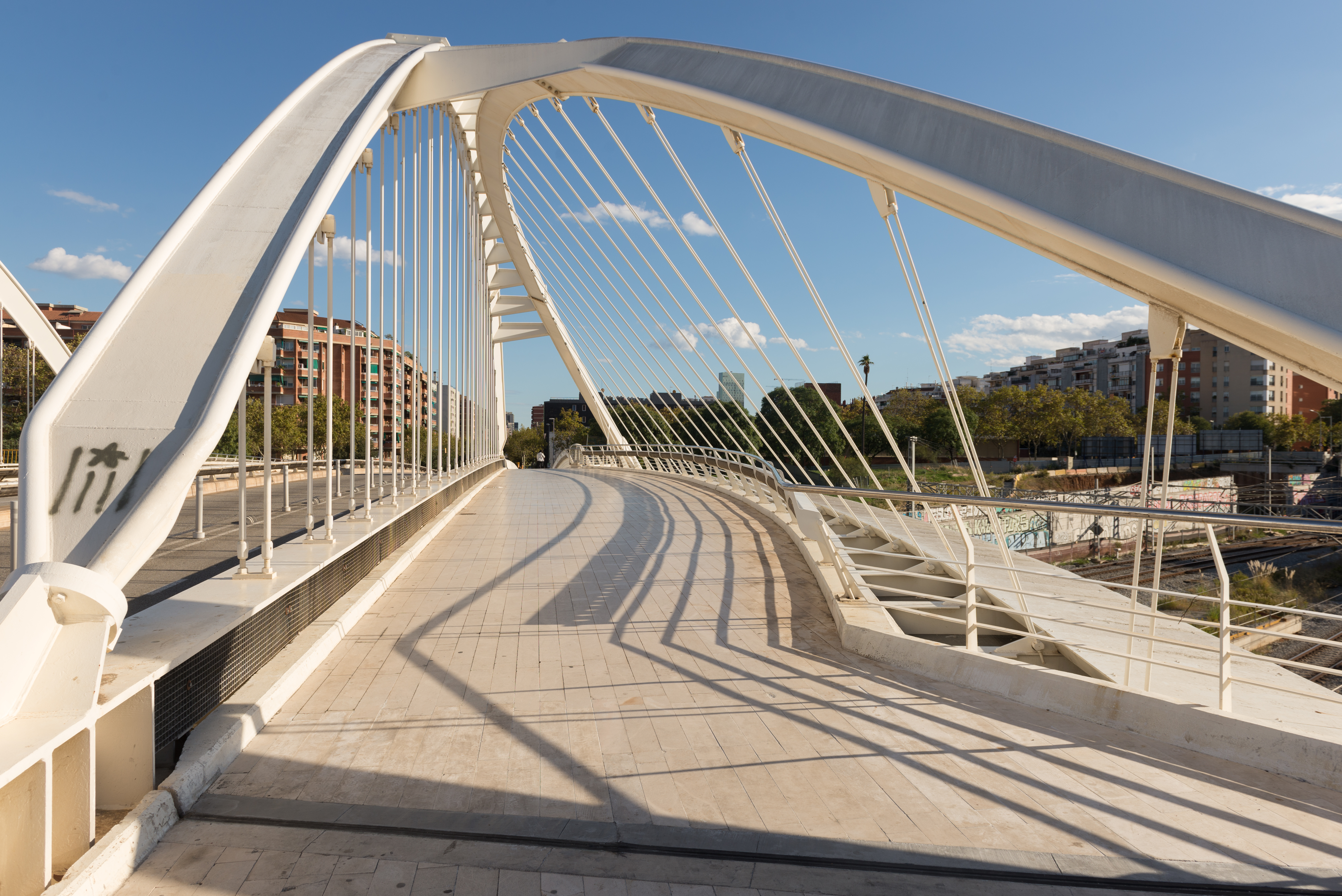
The Bac de Roda Bridge in Barcelona, Spain (1984–87): Calatrava's first bridge

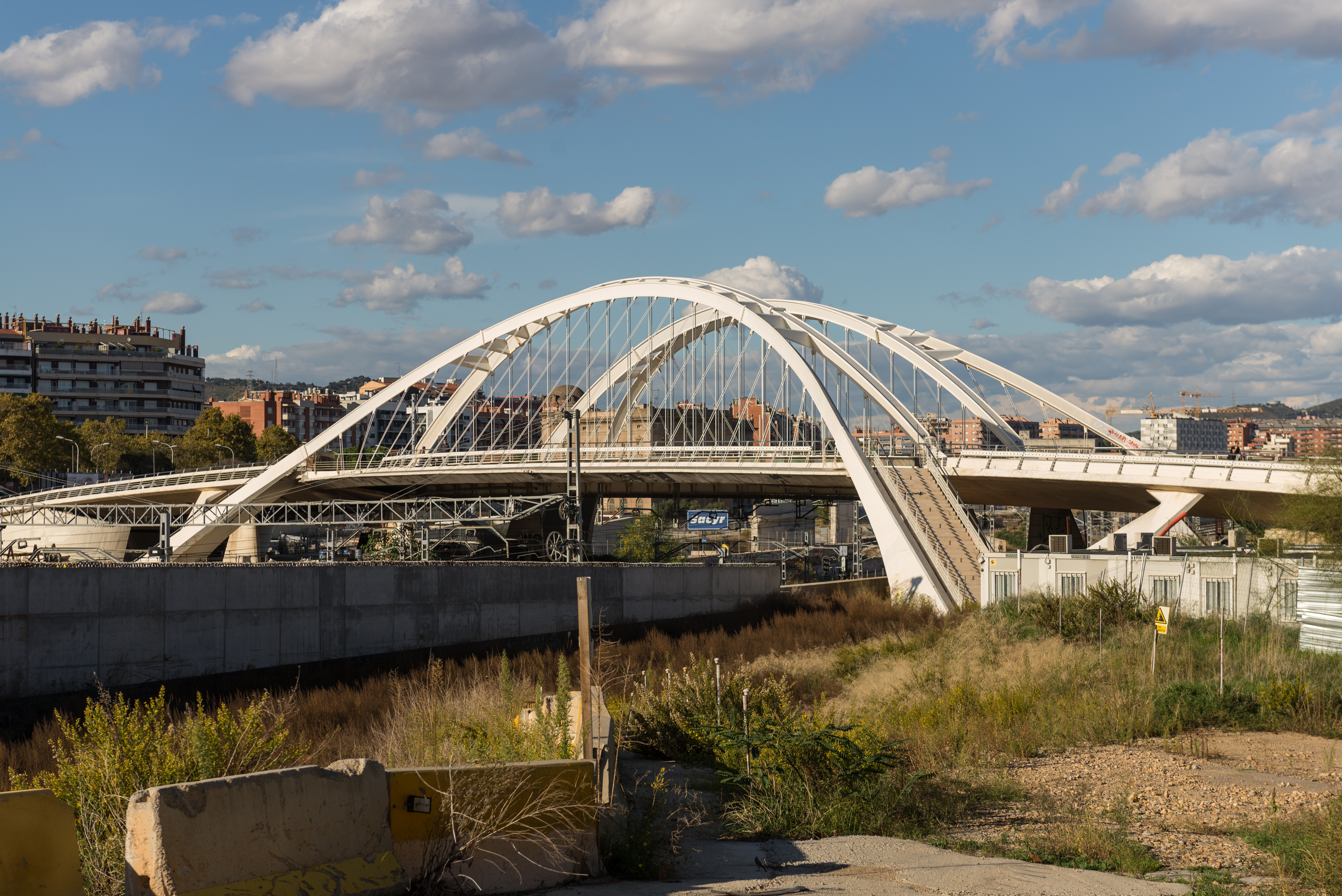
The Bac de Roda Bridge in Barcelona, Spain (1984–87)

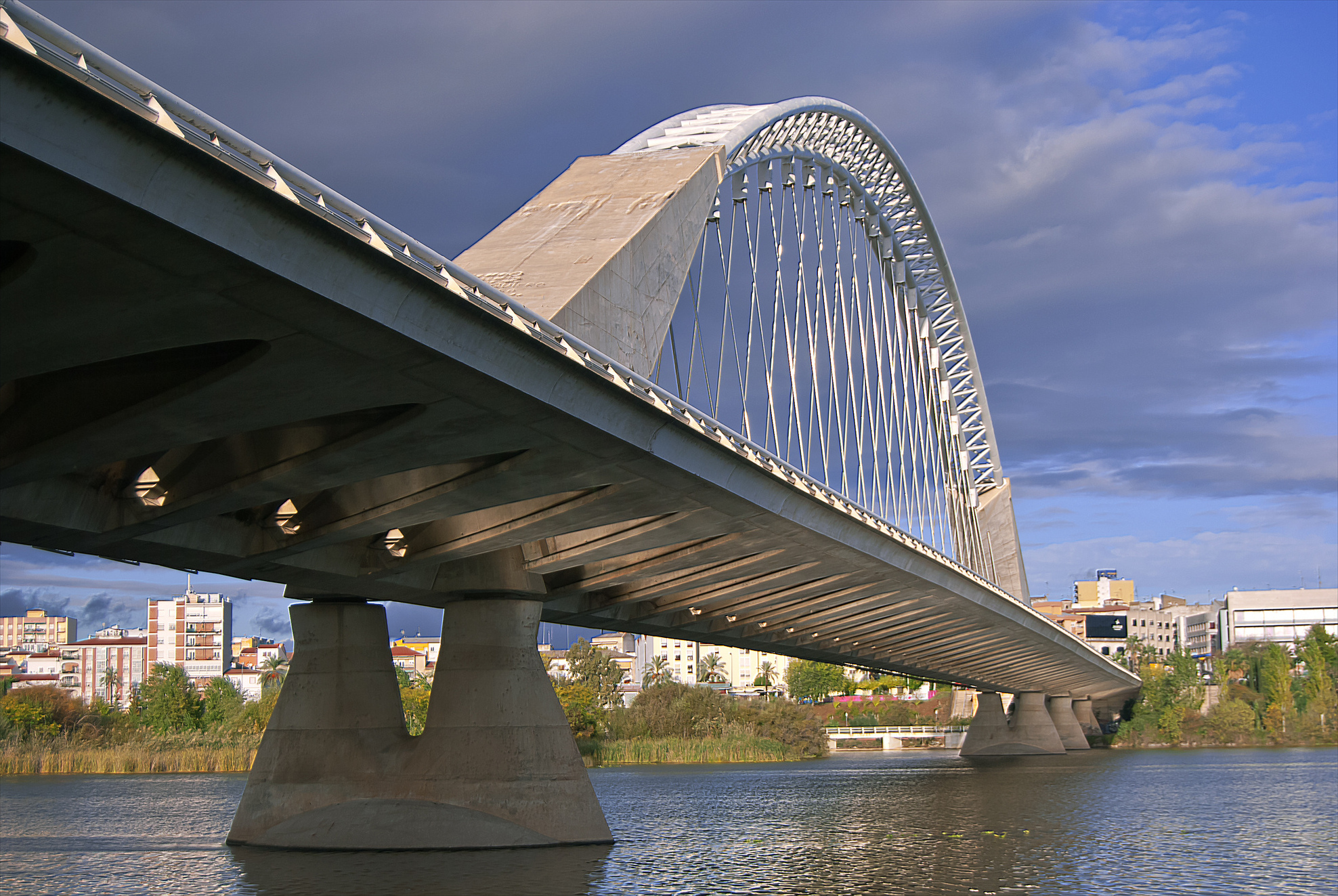
Lusitania Bridge, Mérida, Spain (1988–91)

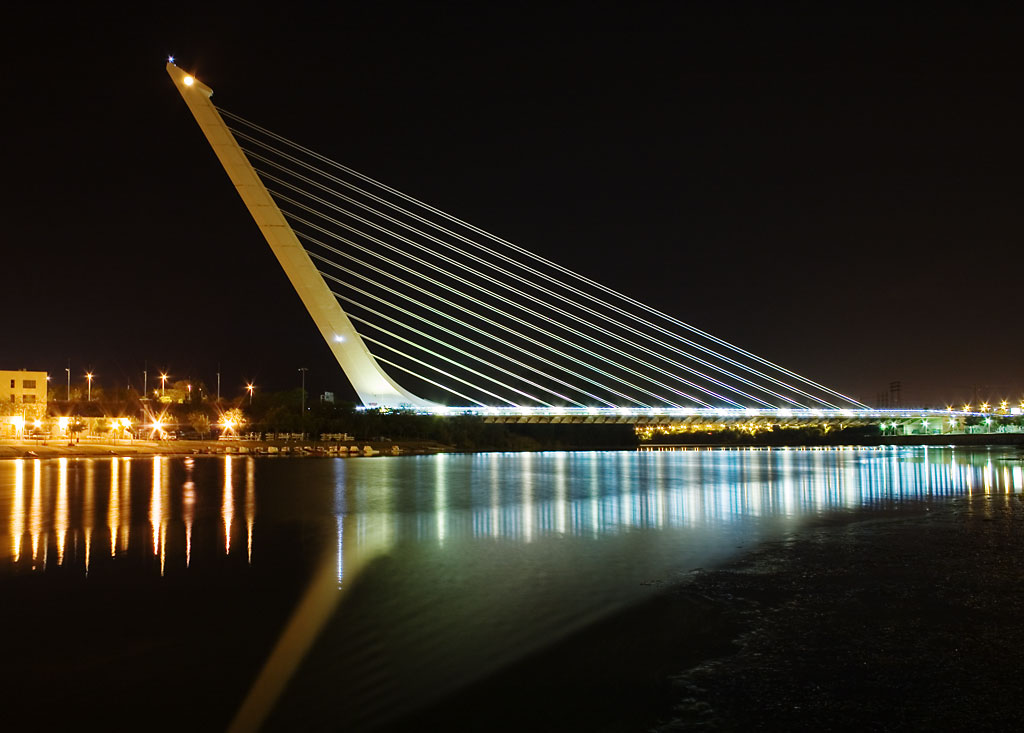
Puente del Alamillo Expo 92, Seville, Spain (1992)

As soon as Calatrava completed his doctorate in 1981, he opened his own office in Zurich. He designed an exposition hall, a factory, a library, and two bridges, but none were built. Finally in 1983, he began to receive commissions for industrial and transportation structures of increasingly greater size; he designed and built the Entrepôt Jakem, a warehouse in Münchwilen, Thurgau, Switzerland, another warehouse in Coesfeld-Lette, Germany, an addition to the main post office in Lucerne, Switzerland; a bus shelter in St. Gallen, Switzerland (1983–85); the roof of a school in Wohlen, Switzerland (1983–88), and then some major projects; a new hall for the railway station in Lucerne (1983–89) and then an entire train station, the Zürich Stadelhofen railway station in Switzerland (1983–1990). The train station has several of the features that became signatures of his work; straight lines and right angles are rare. The railroad platforms curve, the supporting columns lean, the concrete walls of the modernistic cavern beneath the tracks are everywhere pierced with teardrop shaped skylights, and tilting glass panels provide light and shelter without enclosing the platforms.

In 1984–87, he built his first bridge, the Bac de Roda Bridge in Barcelona, Spain, which for the first time brought him international notice. The bridge, designed for cyclists and pedestrians, connects two parts of the city by crossing a wasteland of railway tracks. It is 128 metres (420 ft) long, with twin arches which lean at an angle of thirty degrees; a feature which quickly became the stylistic signature of Calatrava. The upper portion of the bridge, composed of steel arches and cables, is light and airy, like a network of lace, anchored to the massive concrete supports and granite pillars below.

His next bridge, the Puente del Alamillo (1987–1992), in Seville, Spain, was even more spectacular and cemented his reputation. Built as part of the 1992 Expo 92, it is 200 metres (660 ft) long, crossing the Meandro San Jeronimo River. Its main feature is a single pylon 142 metres (466 ft) high, leaning to 58 degrees, the same angle as the Great Pyramid of Giza in Egypt. The weight of the concrete of the pylon is sufficient to hold up the bridge with just thirteen pairs of cables, eliminating the need for any cables behind it.

== Projects of the 1990s ==
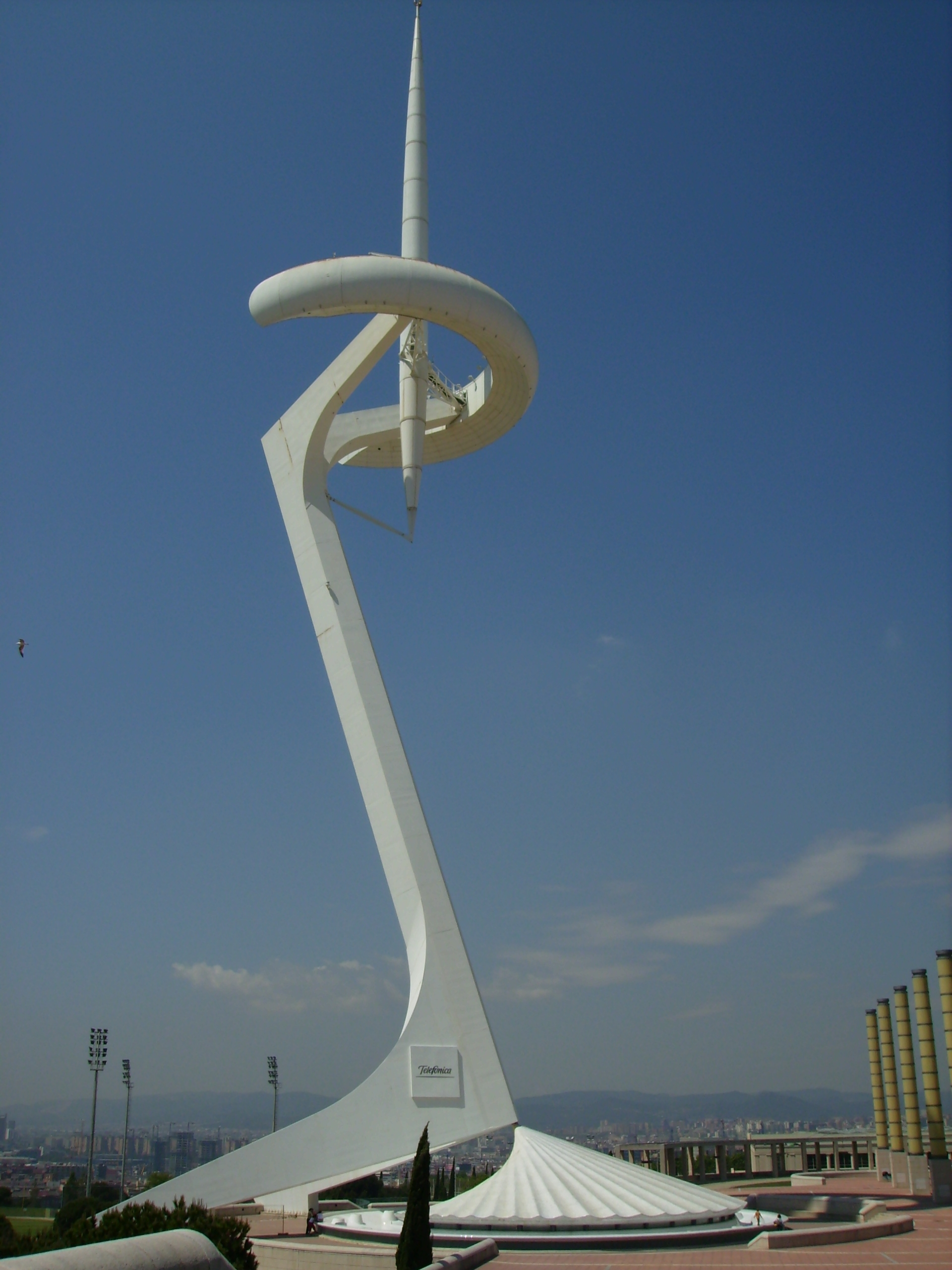
Montjuïc Communications Tower, Barcelona (1989–92)

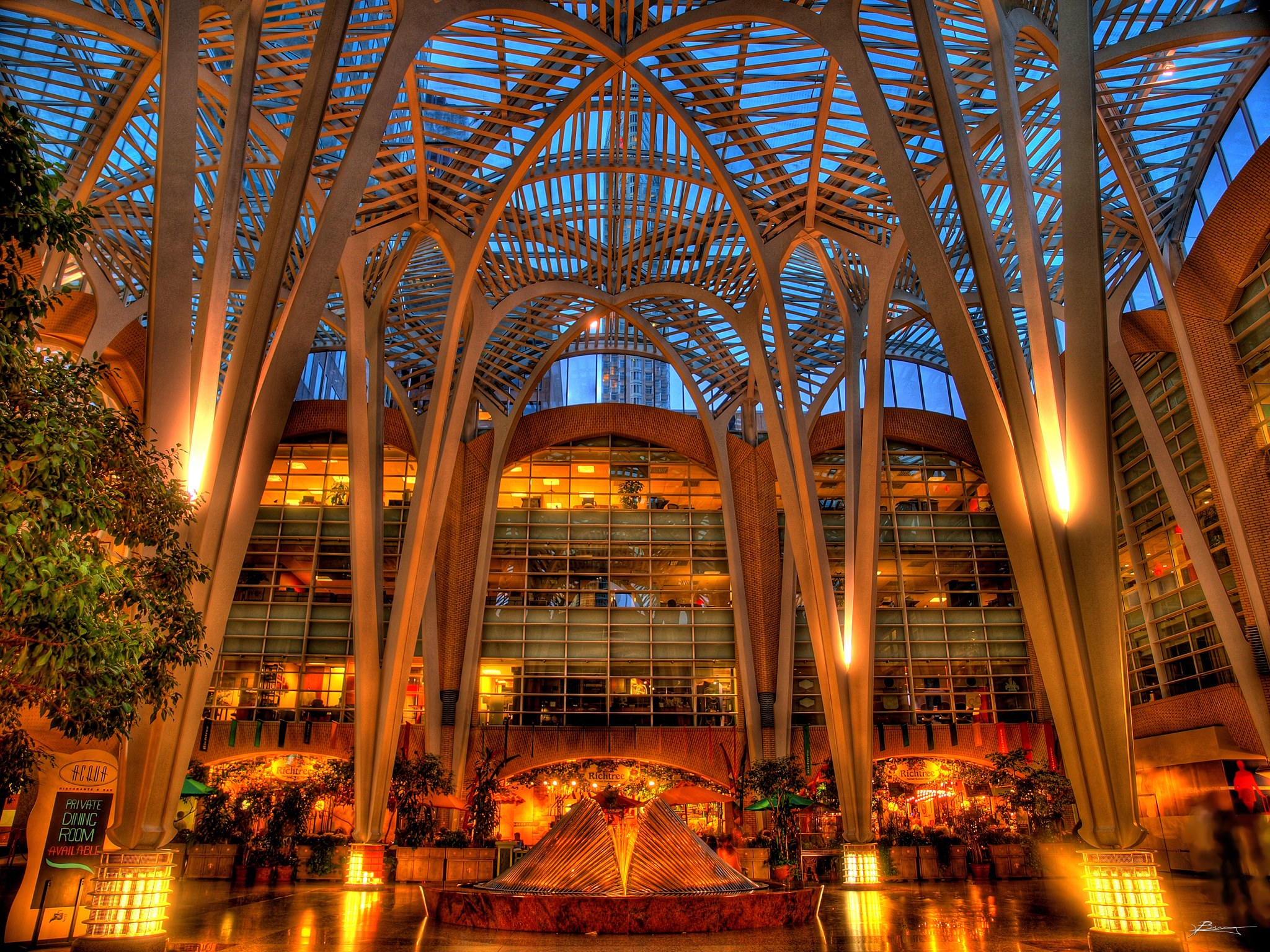
Atrium of Brookfield Place (Toronto), Ontario, Canada (1992)

The Gare de Lyon Saint-Exupéry airport railroad terminal in Lyon, France (1989–94)

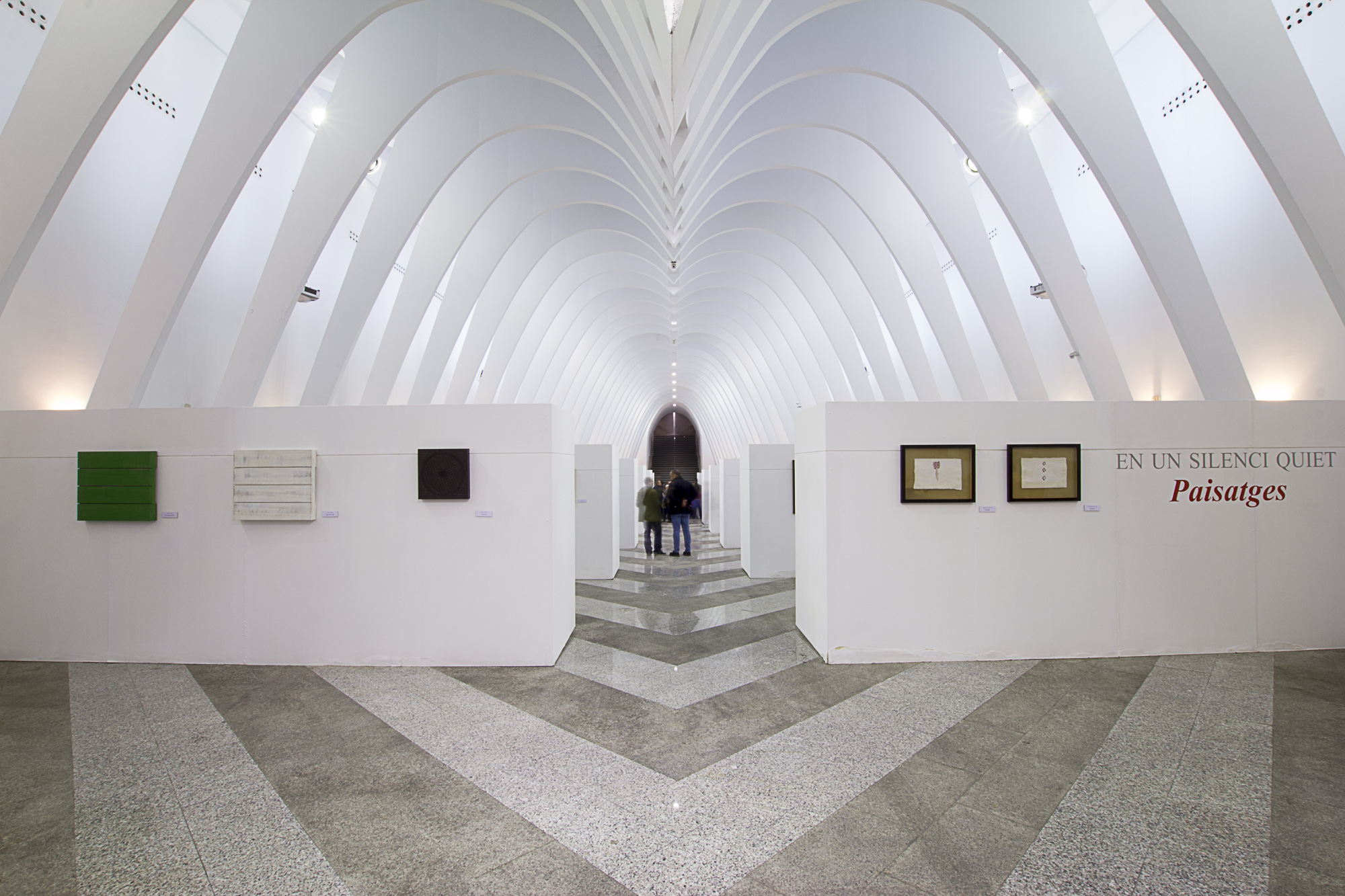
Llotja de Sant Jordi, Alcoy (Alicante), Spain (1992–95)

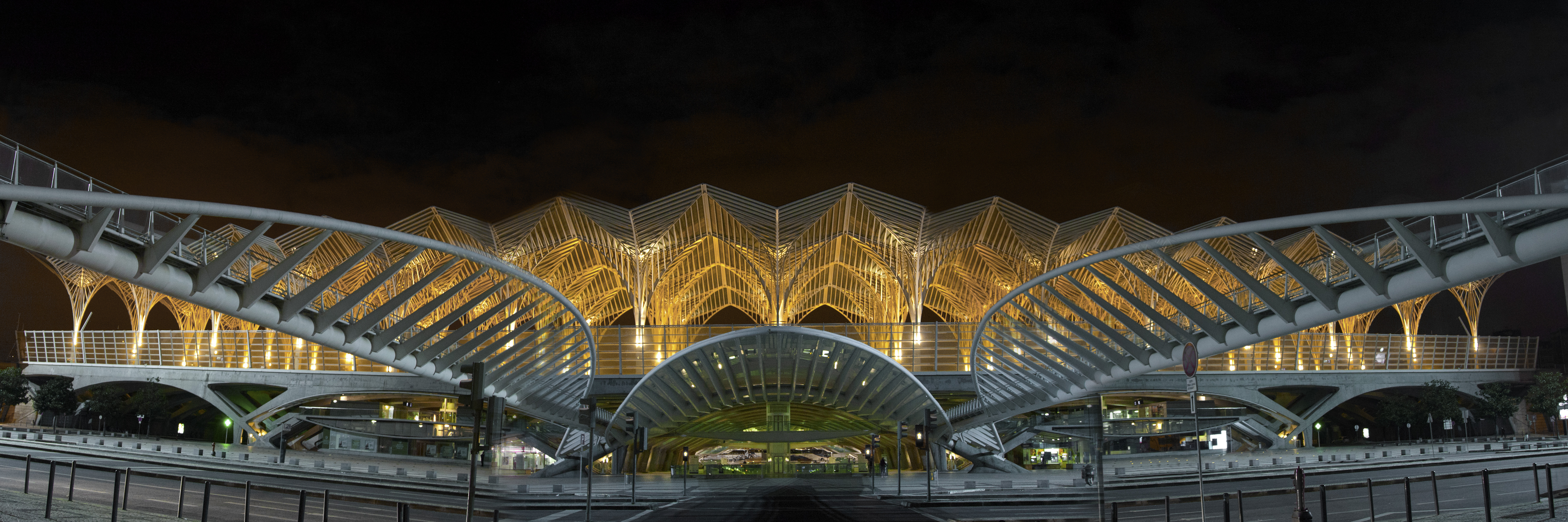
Gare do Oriente, Lisbon, Portugal (1998)

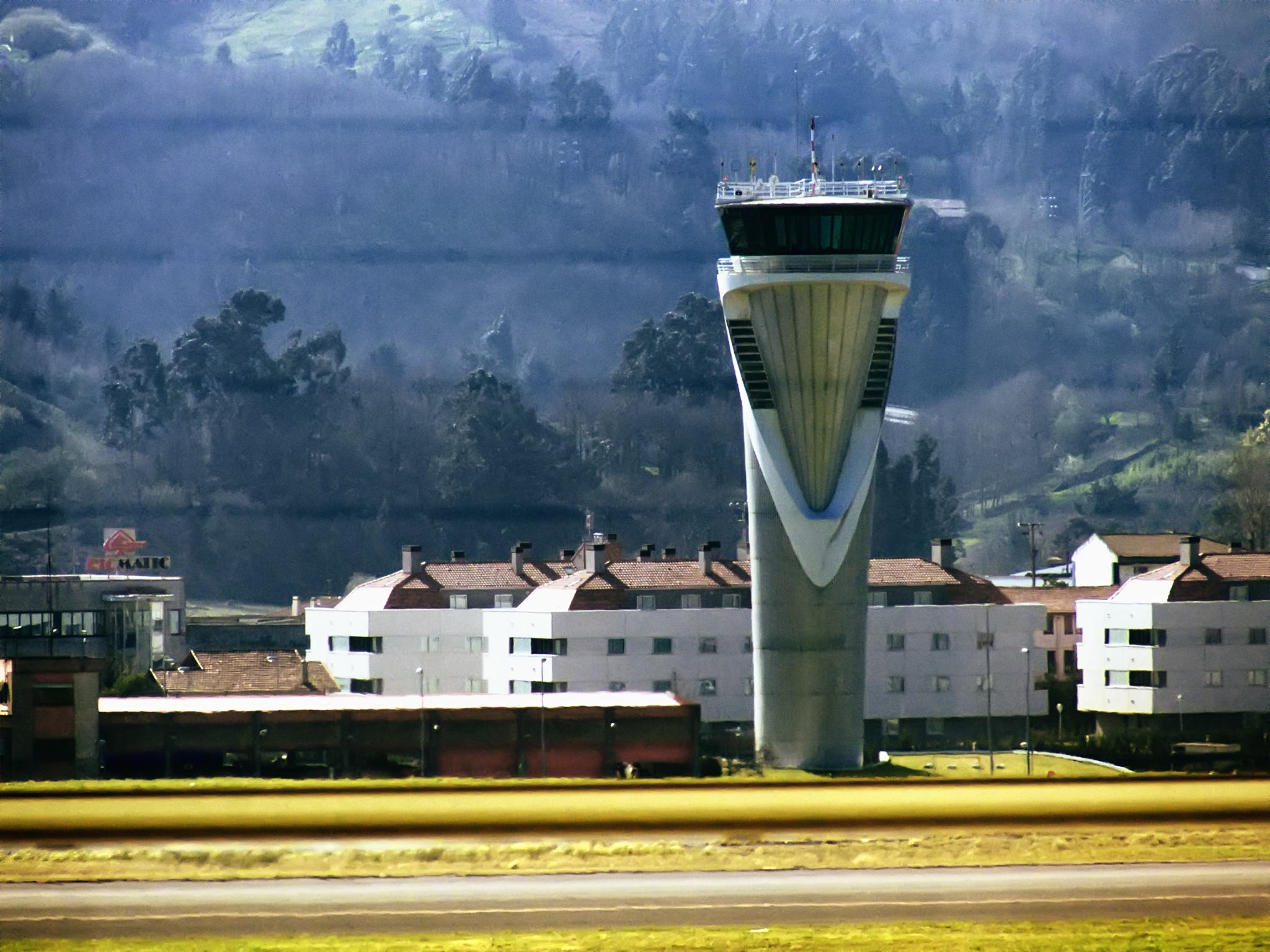
Bilbao Airport control tower (1990–2000)

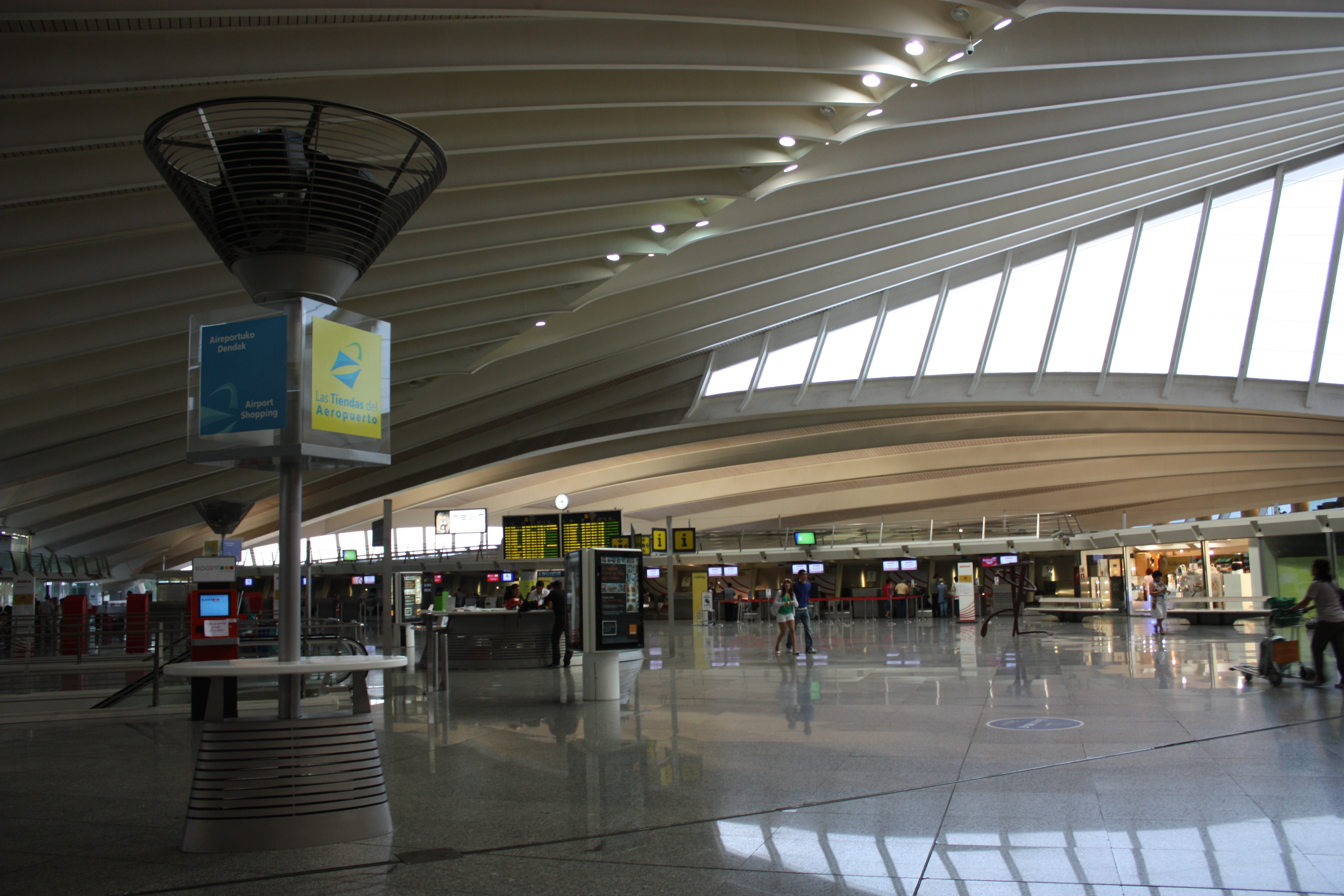
Bilbao Airport Passenger Terminal (1990–2000)

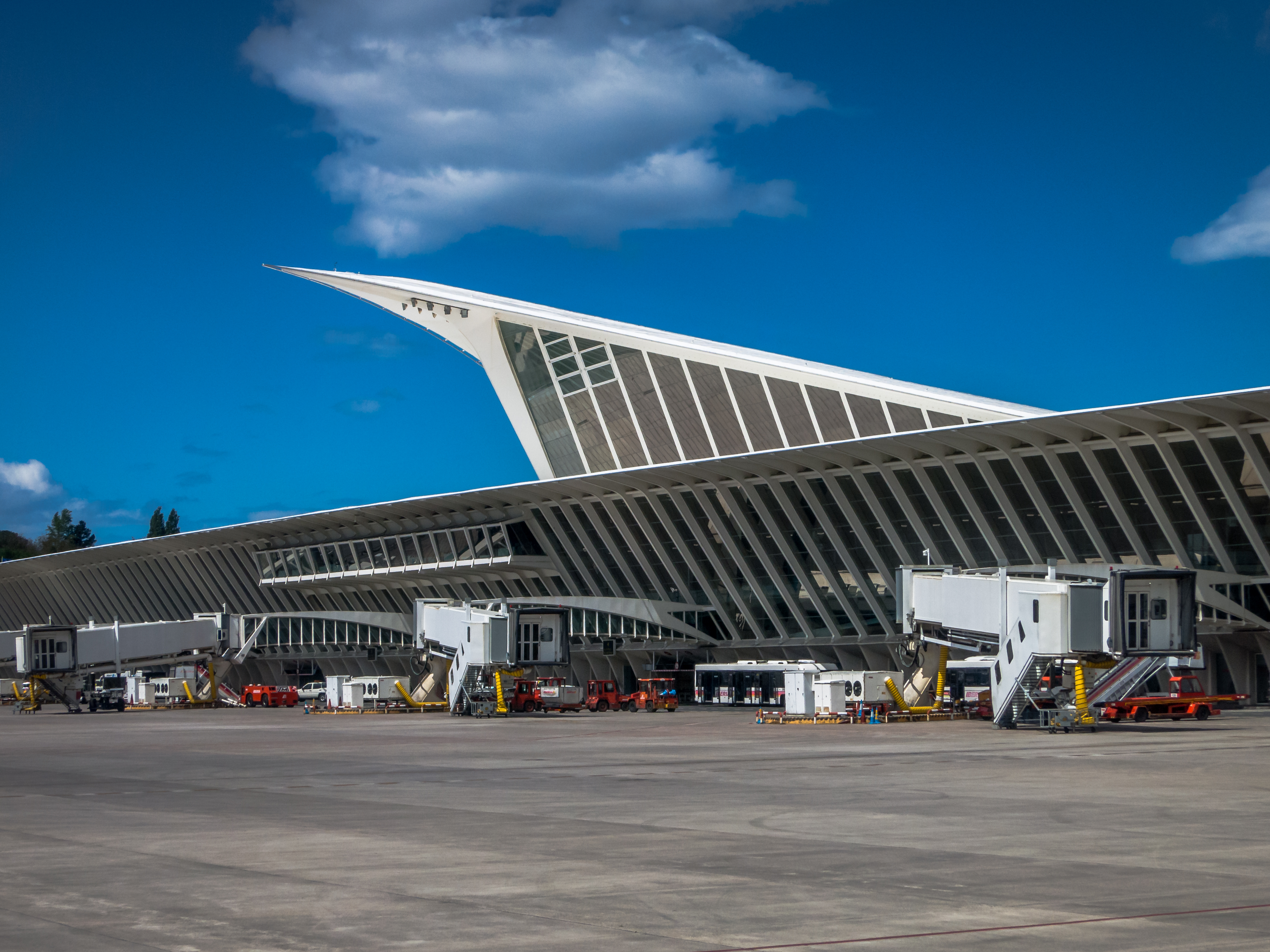
Bilbao Airport Passenger Terminal (1990–2000)

At the beginning of the 1990s, Calatrava built several remarkable railway stations and bridges, but broadened his portfolio by designing a wider range of structures, including a Canadian office complex, a new passenger terminal for Bilbao airport, and his first building in the United States, the new structure of the Milwaukee Art Museum. In 1992, he completed one of his most picturesque and sculptural works, the Montjuïc Communications Tower in Barcelona (1989–92), a 136 m (446 ft)-high graceful concrete spire designed for the site of the 1992 Olympics. The concrete pylon leans backwards, and seems to grasp the vertical broadcast antennas. Its form suggests an athlete about to throw a javelin. The circular building at the base of the tower, which contains the broadcast equipment, is clad in white bricks and is equipped with metal resembling an eye which opens and closes. The building has a particularly Catalan touch, borrowed from the park benches of Park Güell of Antonio Gaudi: a decoration of colorful ceramics tiles. The square next to it is laid out like a giant sundial, on which the tower casts its shadow. In 1992, he also finished his first North American project, the Allen Lambert Galleria in Toronto, Ontario, Canada. The interior of the office complex is covered by a glass roof supported by columns like gigantic trees, a modern version of the Belle Epoque Les Halles market in Paris.

=== Gare de Lyon Saint-Exupéry (1989–1994) and the Eastern Train Station in Lisbon (1992–1998) ===
Two years later, in 1994, he completed another notable train station, the Gare de Lyon Saint-Exupéry (1989–1994) at the Lyon airport in Satolas. This building was designed to be both a functional link between the airport and train station, the terminal for the high-speed TGV trains, and a symbol of the Rhone-Alps Region. The station is covered by a giant shell of steel and glass, 120 by 100 metres (390 by 330 ft), suspended at a maximum height of 40 metres (130 ft), and weighing 1,300 tonnes (1,300 long tons; 1,400 short tons). It is connected with the airport terminal by a 180 metres (590 ft) long glass and concrete bridge. The glass and steel sides and skylights of the terminal from the inside resemble a modernistic cathedral; the glass panels at the top are intended to suggest flight. From the outside, the station has been said to resemble a prehistoric animal, while the glass-and-steel bridge has been compared to a bird or a manta ray.

The Gare do Oriente, or eastern train station, was constructed for the 1998 Lisbon World Exposition, and is located in a former industrial area. It was designed to bridge the wasteland which separated the residential area of the city from the Tagus River. Similar to the galleria he designed in Toronto, but on a grander scale, the interior of the station features a forest of white columns like gigantic trees that support the glass roof, 238 by 78 metres (781 by 256 ft), which covers the eight tracks. The station complex also includes a shopping center, and transport links by tram and metro to the center of the city. With its multiple arches and curves, the structure appears to be moving and ready to take off.

=== Bilbao Airport (1990–2000) ===
One of his last projects in the 20th century was the Bilbao Airport in Spain, notable both for its unusual control tower, 42 metres (138 ft) high – made of concrete clad with aluminum, which widens as it grows taller, and which resembles a statue holding its hands in front of it – and for terminal buildings, where the white concrete structures are united with aluminum forms. The terminal buildings themselves lift upwards and seem to be trying to take off, giving them the airport the popular nickname of "The Dove".

== Museums, concert halls and skyscrapers (2000–2010) ==
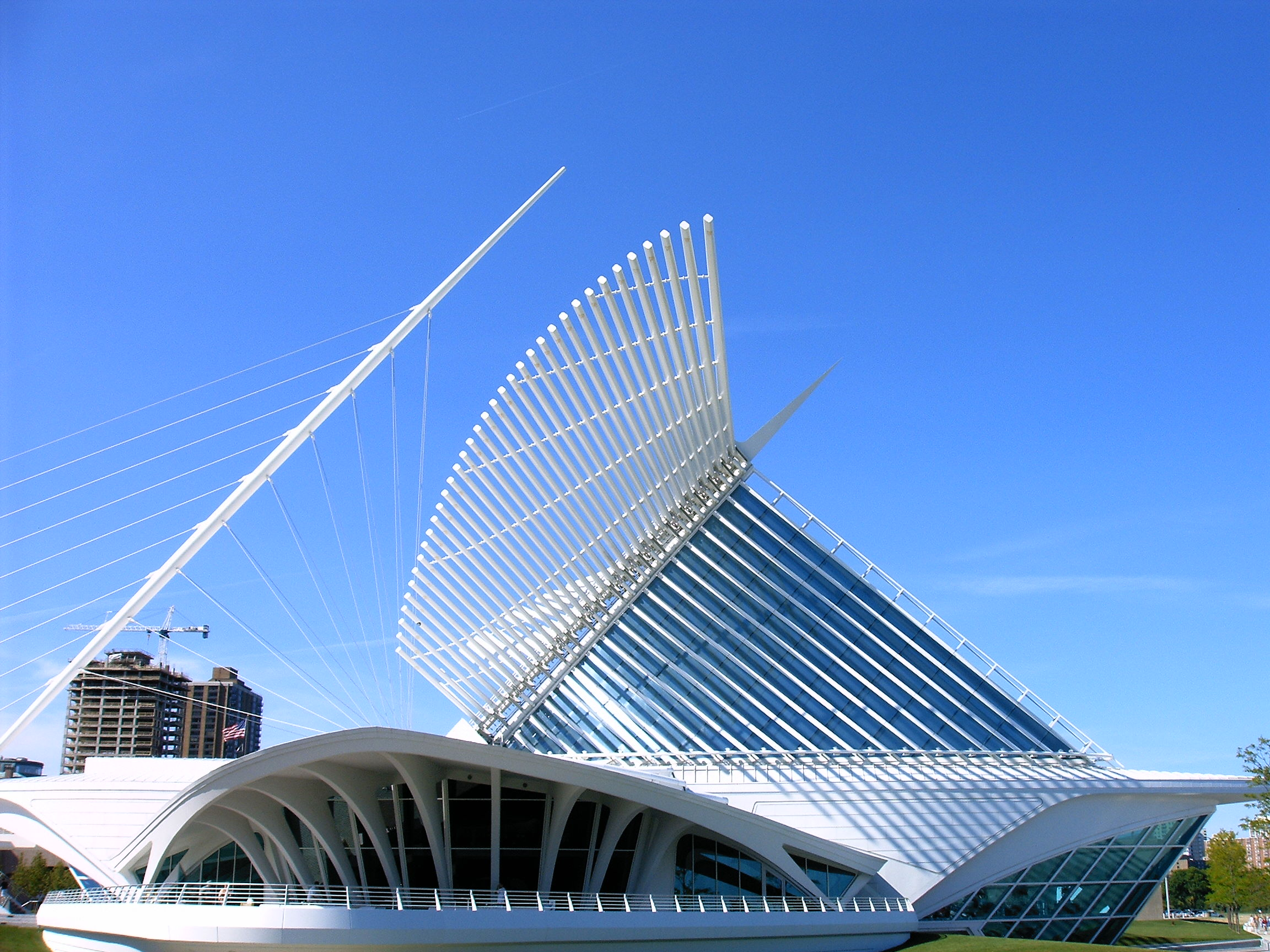
The Milwaukee Art Museum in Milwaukee, Wisconsin (1994–2001)

The Milwaukee Art Museum Brise-Soleil

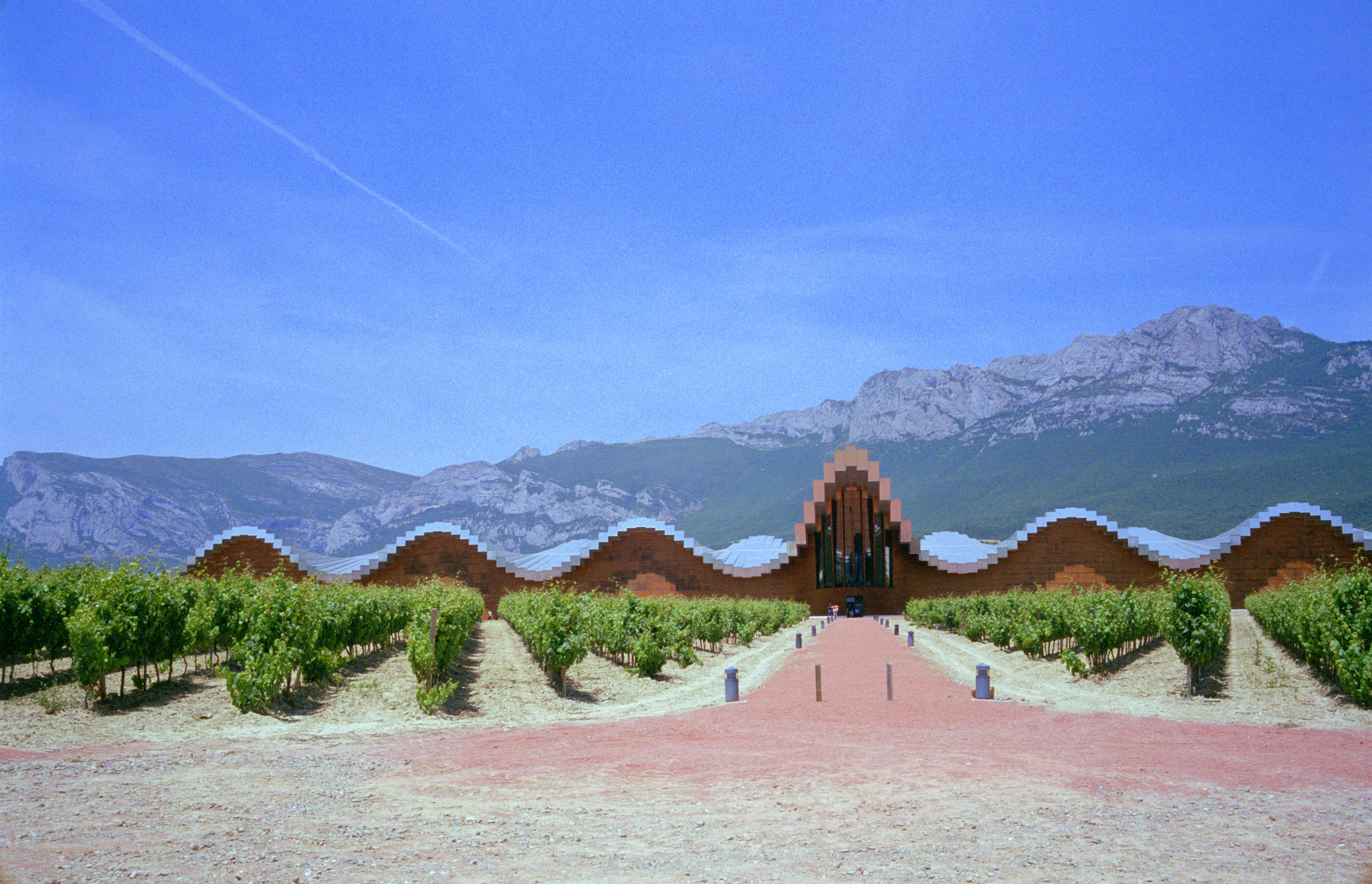
Bodegas Ysios winery in Laguardia, Spain (1998–2001)

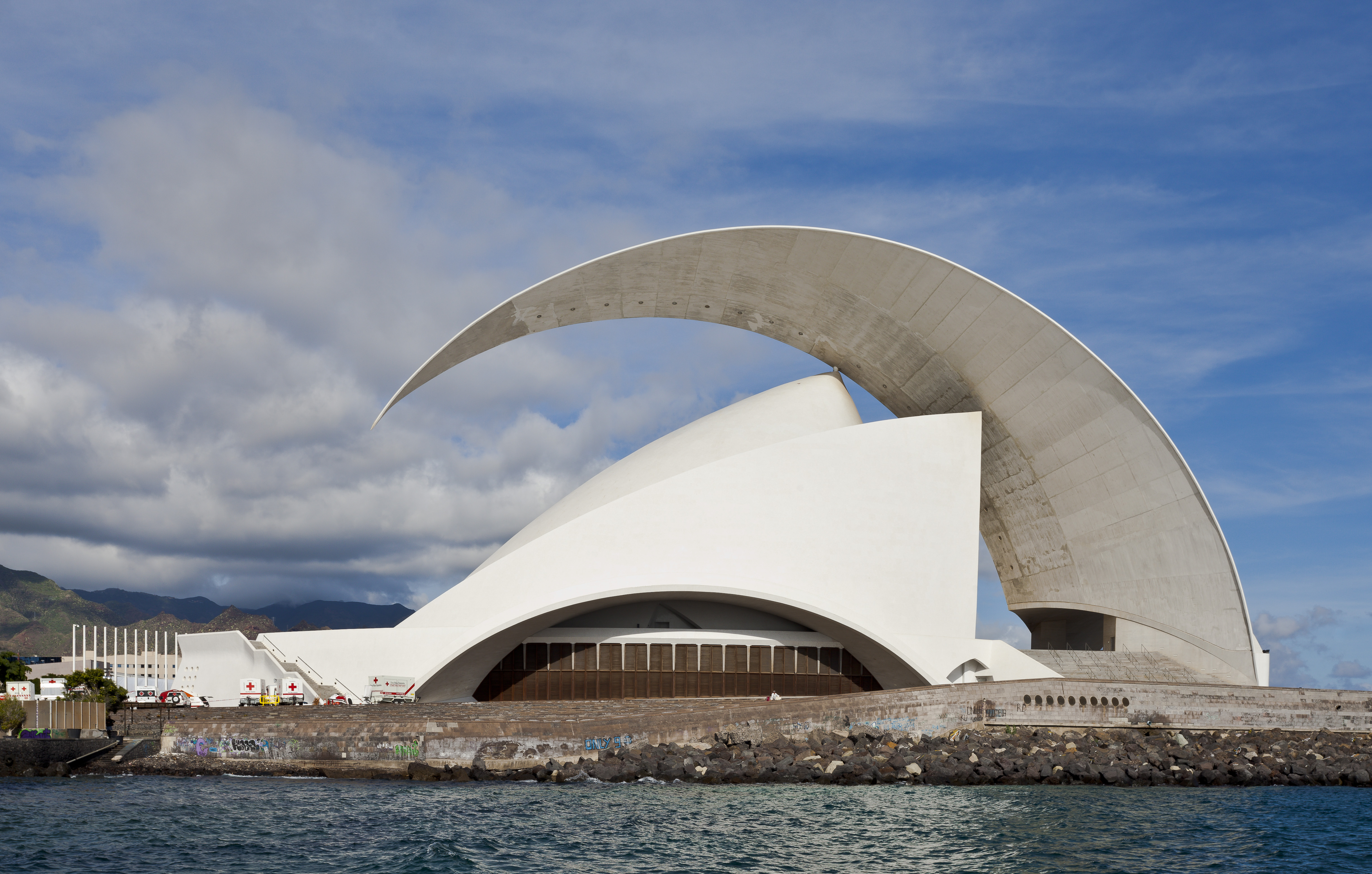
Auditorio de Tenerife in the Canary Islands (1991–2003)

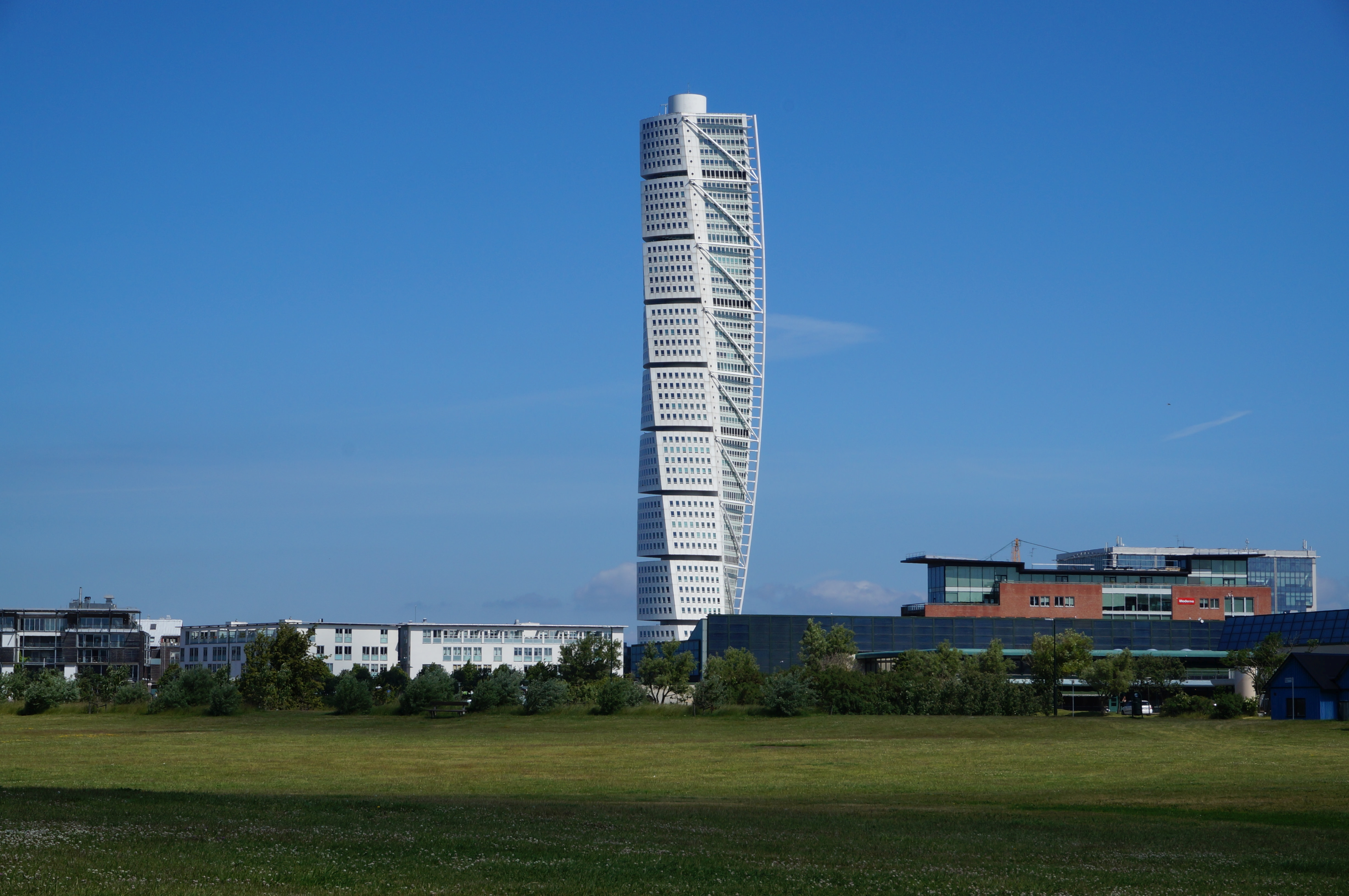
Turning Torso in Malmö, Sweden (1999–2004)

Velodrome for 2004 Summer Olympics, Athens, Greece (2004)

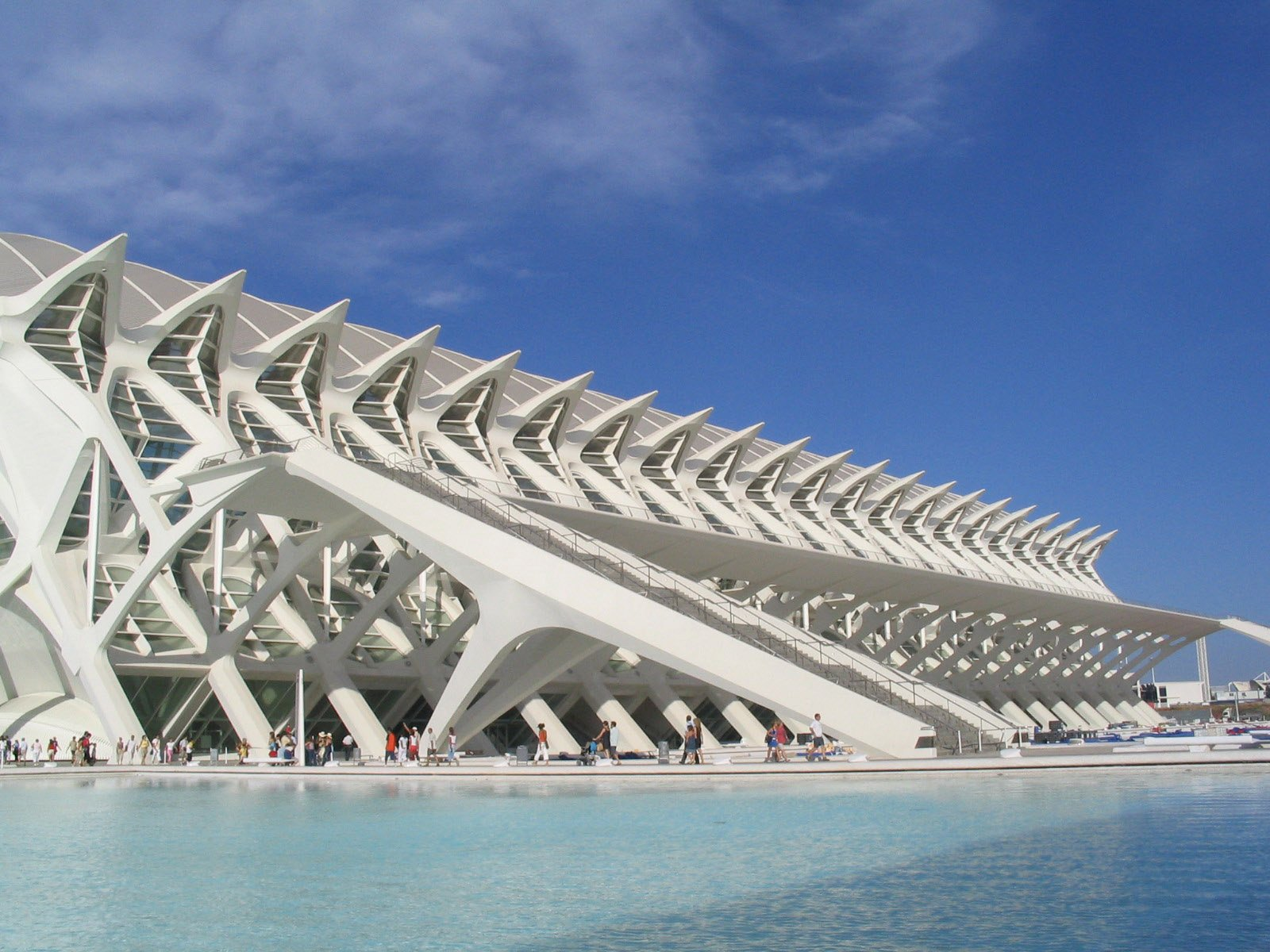
Science Museum in Valencia, Spain (1994–2000)

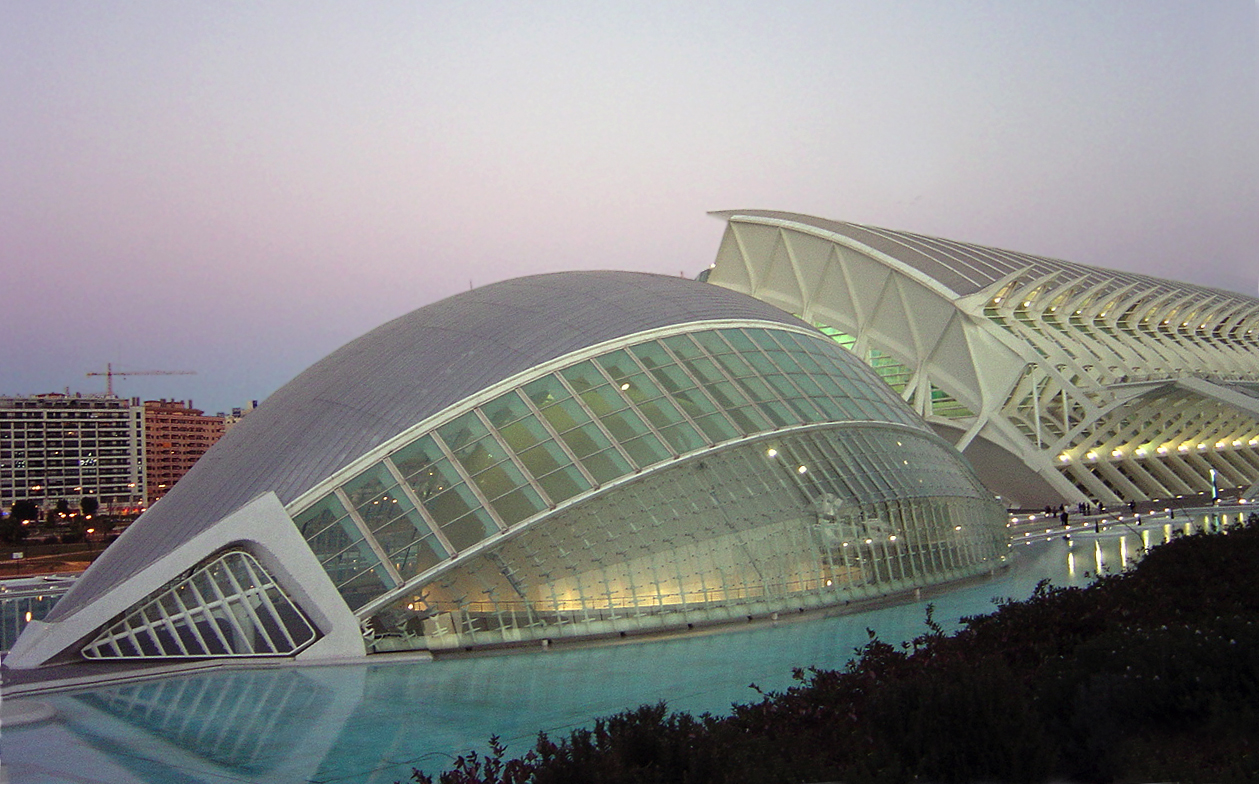
The City of Arts and Sciences in Valencia, Spain (1991–2006)

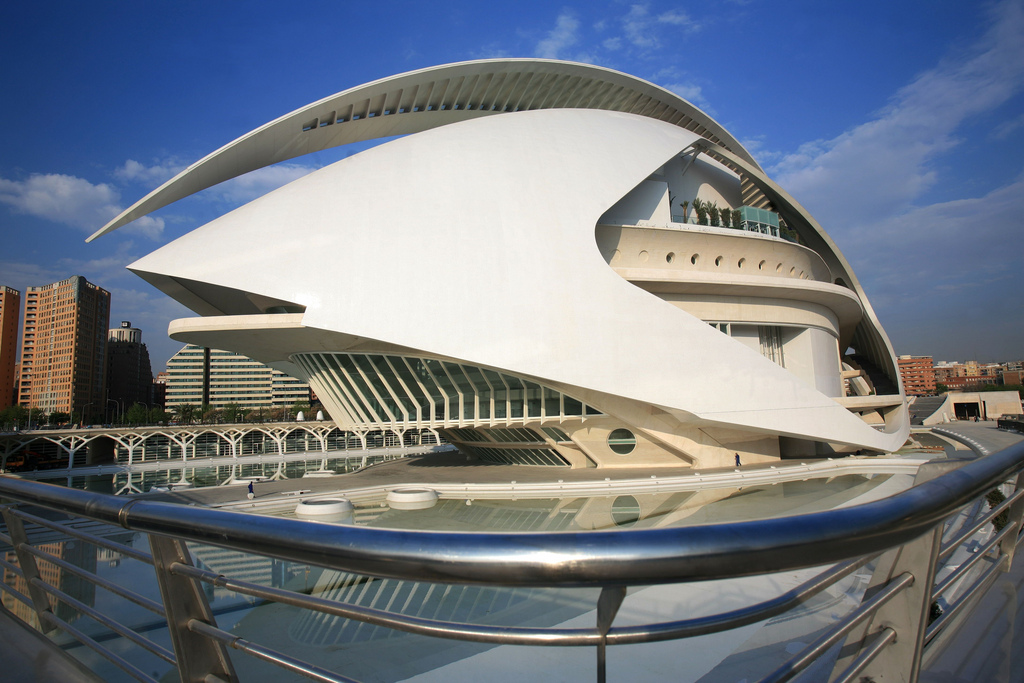
Palace of the Arts in Valencia (2006)

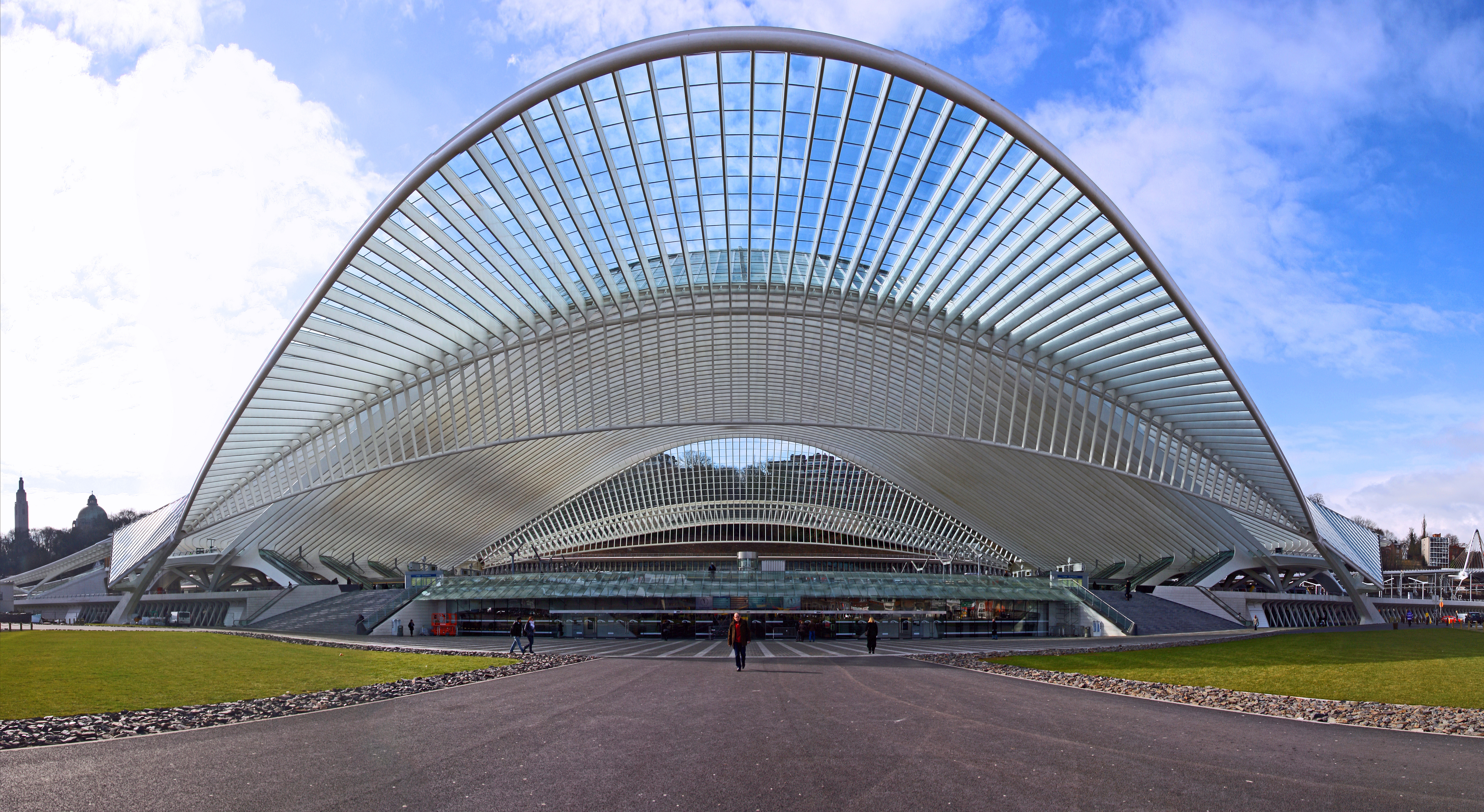
Liège-Guillemins railway station, Liège, Belgium (2009)

Calatrava Pedestrian Bridge in Athens, Greece (2004)

The Olympic Stadium of Athens, with its characteristic roof (2002–2004)

Athens Olympic Sports Complex, Greece (2004)

Following 2000, Calatrava completed a new addition to the Milwaukee Art Museum, a concert hall in Tenerife in the Canary Islands, a twisting skyscraper in Malmö, Sweden, and a City of Arts and Sciences in Valencia, Spain. in Sweden, and a wooden castle-like winery in Spain, all in astonishing forms and all seemingly in motion.

=== Milwaukee Art Museum (1994–2001) ===
The Quadracci Pavilion of the Milwaukee Art Museum (1994–2001) was Calatrava's first building in the United States, and his first museum. It displayed the technical innovations and forms he had first used in his railway stations and airports, but with more freedom of form and architectural theatrics. It is an addition to an existing building, constructed by Eero Saarinen in 1957 next to Lake Michigan, with a later addition in 1975 by David Kahler. The purpose of the new pavilion, as defined by the museum board, was to give the museum a new entrance, and especially "to redefine the identity of the museum with a strong image." Calatrava's design was selected after a competition entered by seventy-seven architects. Calatrava's solution was a glass and steel entry hall 27 metres (89 ft) high with a moveable sun screen roof, composed of two large wings made up of twenty-six smaller wings, from 8 to 32 metres (26 to 105 ft) in length. The sunscreen, weighing 115 tonnes (113 long tons; 127 short tons), can be hoisted up by a single pylon, like an enormous bird's wing, or lowered when the wind from the lake is stronger than 65 kilometres per hour (35 kn). The interior of the structure has a conference hall, exposition space, shops, and a restaurant overlooking the lake. He also designed a suspension footbridge between the center of the city and edge of the lake.

=== Bodegas Ysios winery (1998–2001) ===
The Bodegas Ysios winery in Laguardia, Spain (1998–2001) was designed as a symbol of the Rioja wines made by that winery. Built on a sloping site surrounded by vineyards, the 196-metre (643 ft) long building has an aluminum roof and a facade covered with laminated wood panels, alternating between convex and concave, with a roofline that ripples like a series of waves.

=== Auditorio de Tenerife (1991–2003) ===
The Auditorio de Tenerife, Tenerife, in the Canary Islands, is a concert hall with 1558 seats and a smaller chamber music hall of 428 seats. With a curving concrete cupola 60 metres (200 ft) high, crowned by a curving roof like a breaking wave, it dominates the city square and old town below. The shell is covered with ceramic tiles and the pavement and most of the floors are made of the local basalt stone. The unusual sculptural form of the building gives it a completely different appearance depending upon from where it is viewed.

=== Turning Torso (1999–2004) ===
The Turning Torso in Malmö, Sweden, was Calatrava's first skyscraper, and was the first twisting skyscraper, a form which later appeared in other cities around the world from Shanghai to Moscow. The building was originally conceived by the architect as a sculpture of "seven cubes stacked on a steel support creating a spiral structure resembling a twisting spinal column." The tower is 190 metres (620 ft) high, and twists a full ninety degrees from the base to the top. Each of the nine cubes is like a separate five-story building; each floor contains from one to five apartments. The support holding the structure together is the column of elevators and escalators which communicate between the cubes. A system of discreet cross beams on the exterior frame manage the torsion of the twisting building. In 2016, it was the tallest building in Scandinavia.

=== Athens Olympic Sports Complex (2001–2004) ===
For the 2004 Olympic Games in Athens, Greece, Calatrava won the commission to cover the existing stadium with a new roof, to make a similar roof for the velodrome, and additionally to build four entrance gateways, a monumental sculpture to symbolize the games, and other architectural features to give harmony and variety to the complex. The roof for the stadium, in the form of bent "leaves" of laminated glass, is designed to reflect 90 percent of the sunlight. The roof covers 25,000 square metres (270,000 ft^{2}), and is supported by double-tied arches of tubular steel, with a span of 304 metres (997 ft) and a height of 60 metres (200 ft). It is 250 metres (820 ft) long and 20 metres (66 ft) high, suspended by cables from two parabolic arches. The Velodrome has a white cap supported by two concrete arches 45 metres (148 ft) high, weighing 4,000 tonnes (3,900 long tons; 4,400 short tons), from which the glass and steel roof is suspended. Calatrava also designed an enormous parabolic arch at the entrance and the Wall of Nations, a mobile sculpture of tubular steel which moves in a wavelike patterns.

=== City of Arts and Sciences and Opera House in Valencia (1991–2006) ===
The largest group of buildings by Calatrava is found in his birthplace, Valencia, Spain, and was built in over a decade. It includes the City of Arts and Sciences (1991–2000) and the Opera house (1996–2006), all constructed on a plot of 35 hectares between a highway and a river on the east side of the city. The L'Hemisfèric, like a half-sunken globe, is placed in the centre, next to a large artificial lake, in which it seems to be sinking. The dome is covered by a metal screen which opens and closes, and the entrance opens like a human eye. On one side is the science museum, behind a line of leaning columns, and on the other is the newest structure, the massive shell of the opera house, described by Calatrava as a "monumental sculpture", which gives the impression of being continually in motion.

=== Liège-Guillemins railway station (2009) ===
The Liège-Guillemins railway station for high-speed trains in Liège, Belgium is covered with a lace-like roof of glass and steel 160 metres (520 ft) long and 32 metres (105 ft) high, covering the nine tracks and five platforms. The transparent roof seems to eliminate the distinction between indoors and outdoors.

== Recent major projects (2011–present) ==
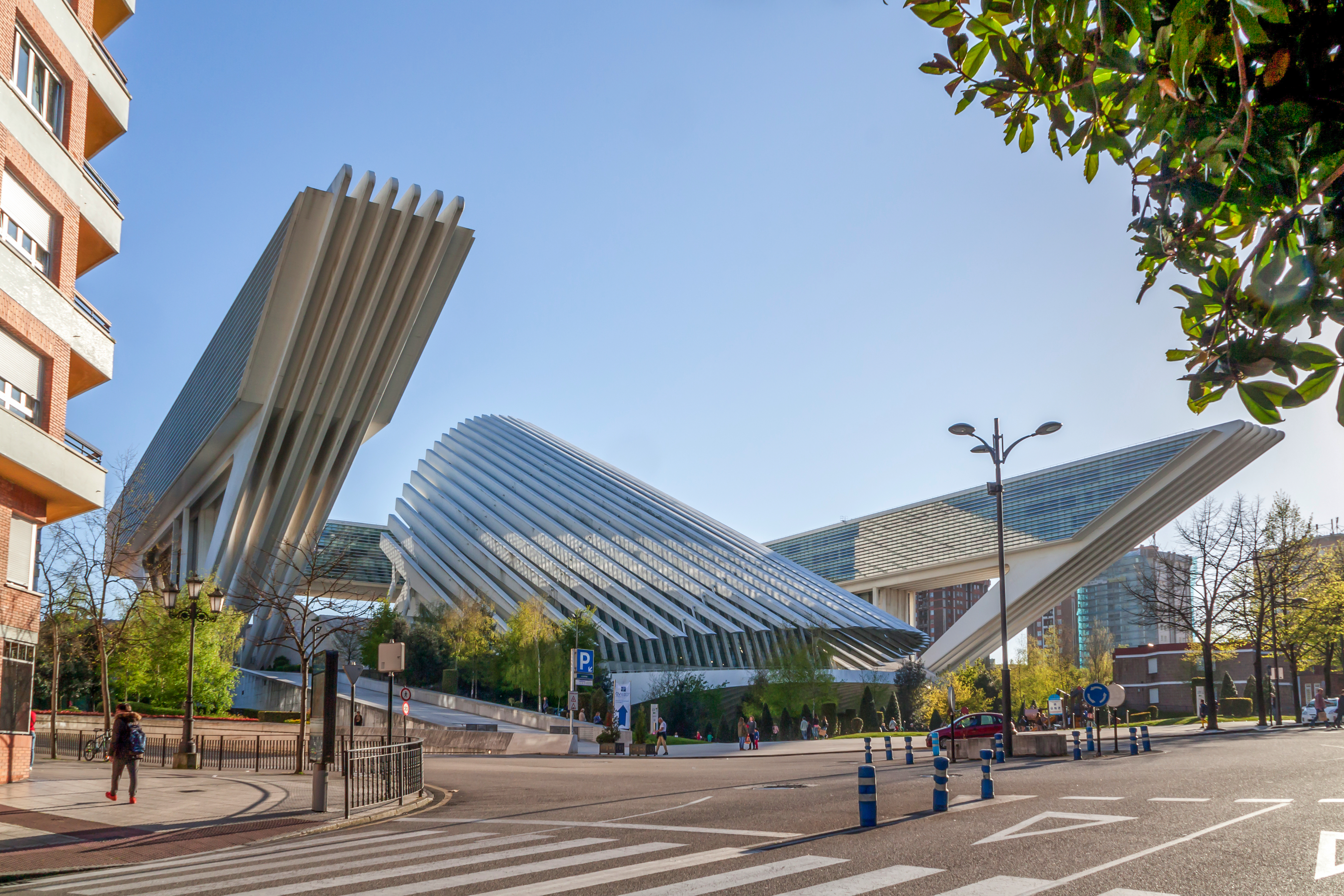
Palace of Congresses in Oviedo, Spain (2000–2011)

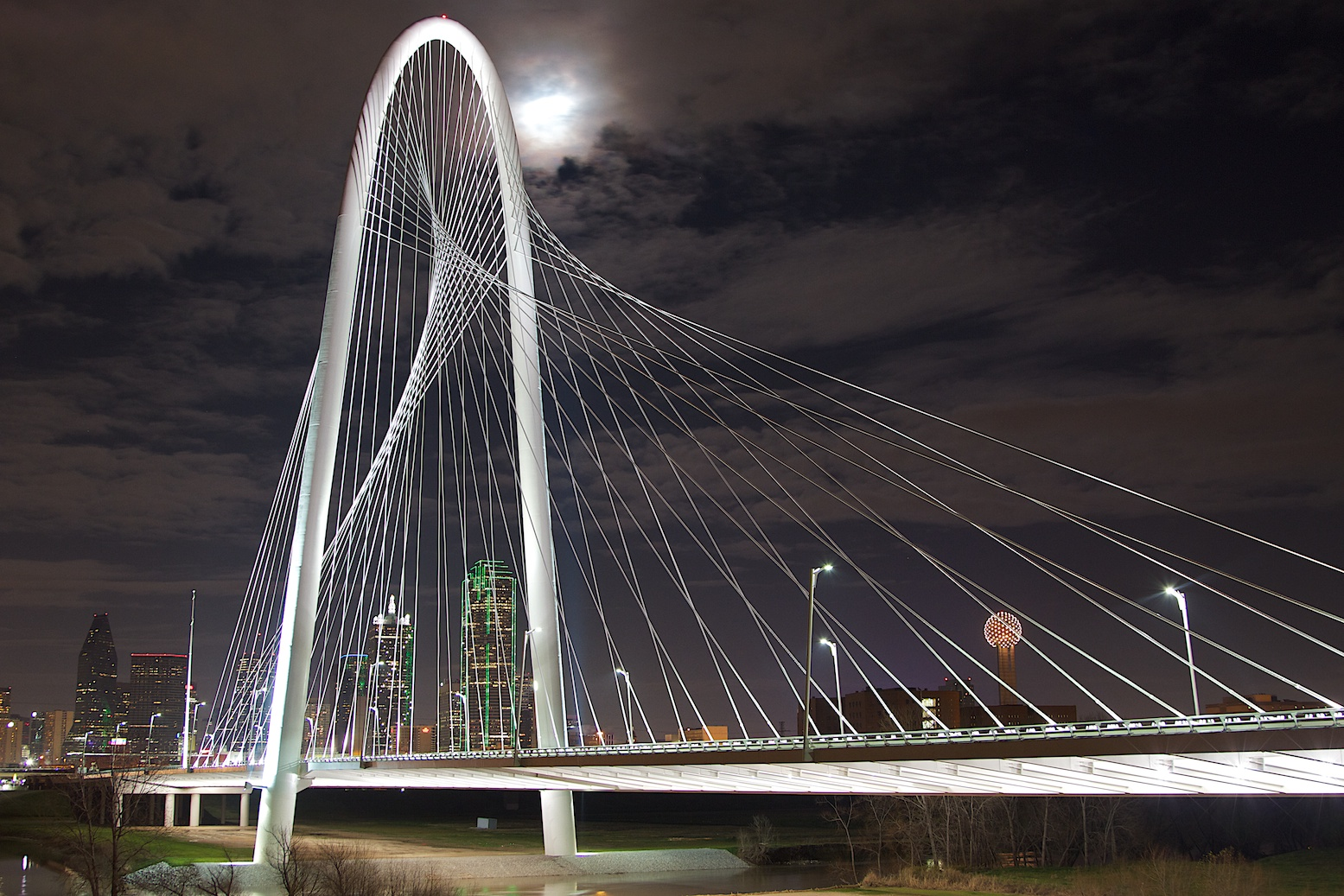
Margaret Hunt Hill Bridge in Dallas, Texas (2012)

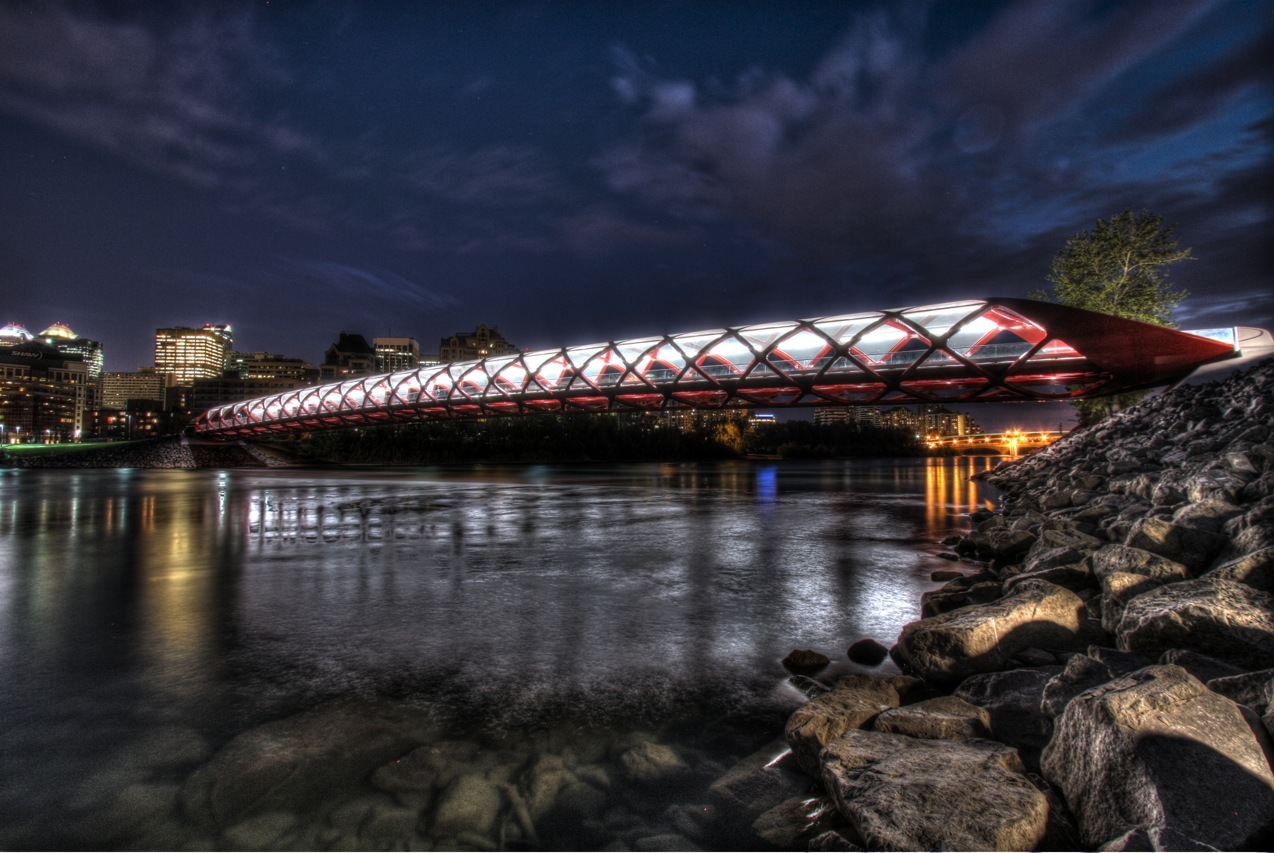
Peace Bridge in Calgary, Canada (2012)

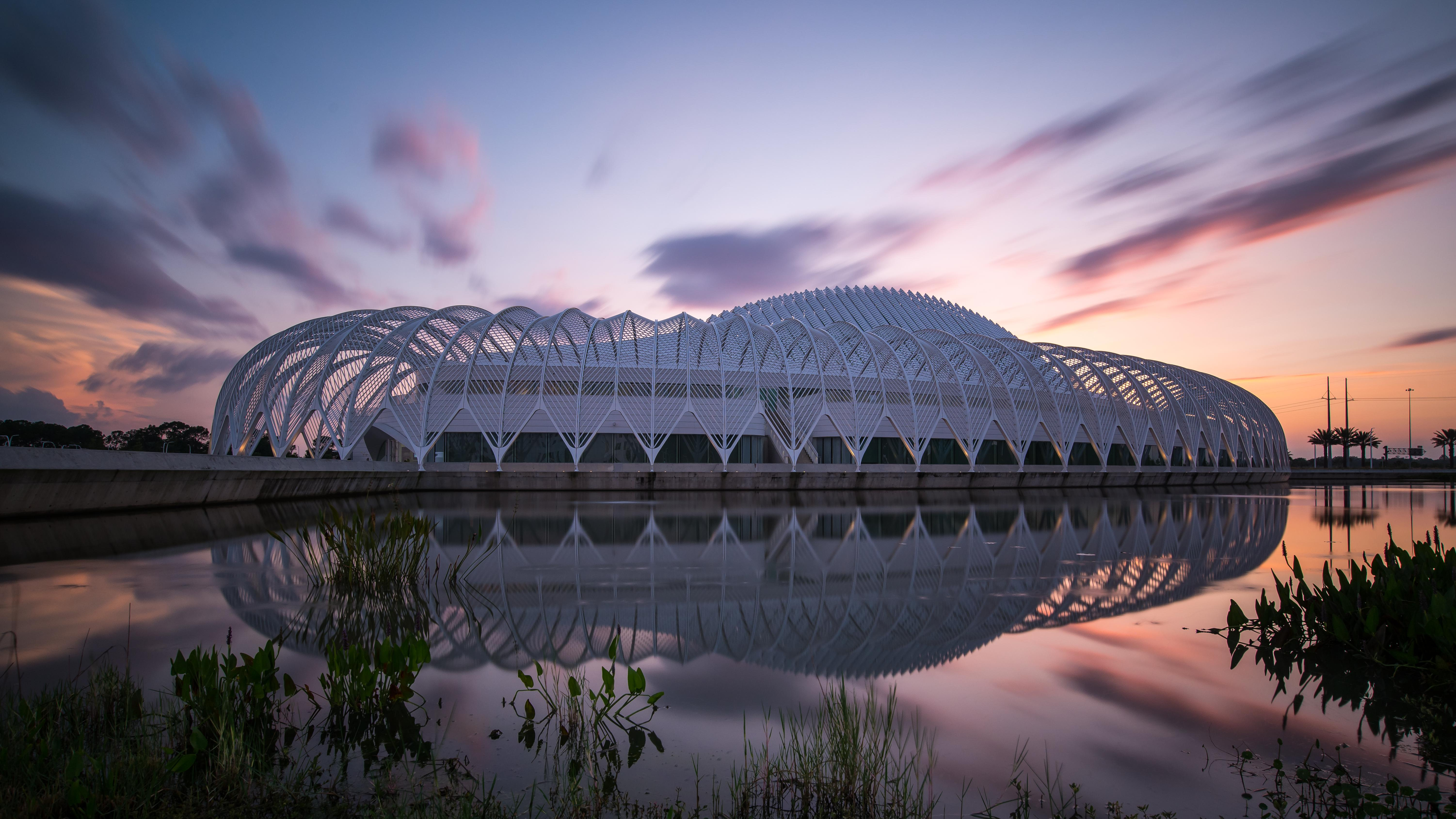
The Innovation, Science, and Technology (IST) Building of the Florida Polytechnic University (2014)

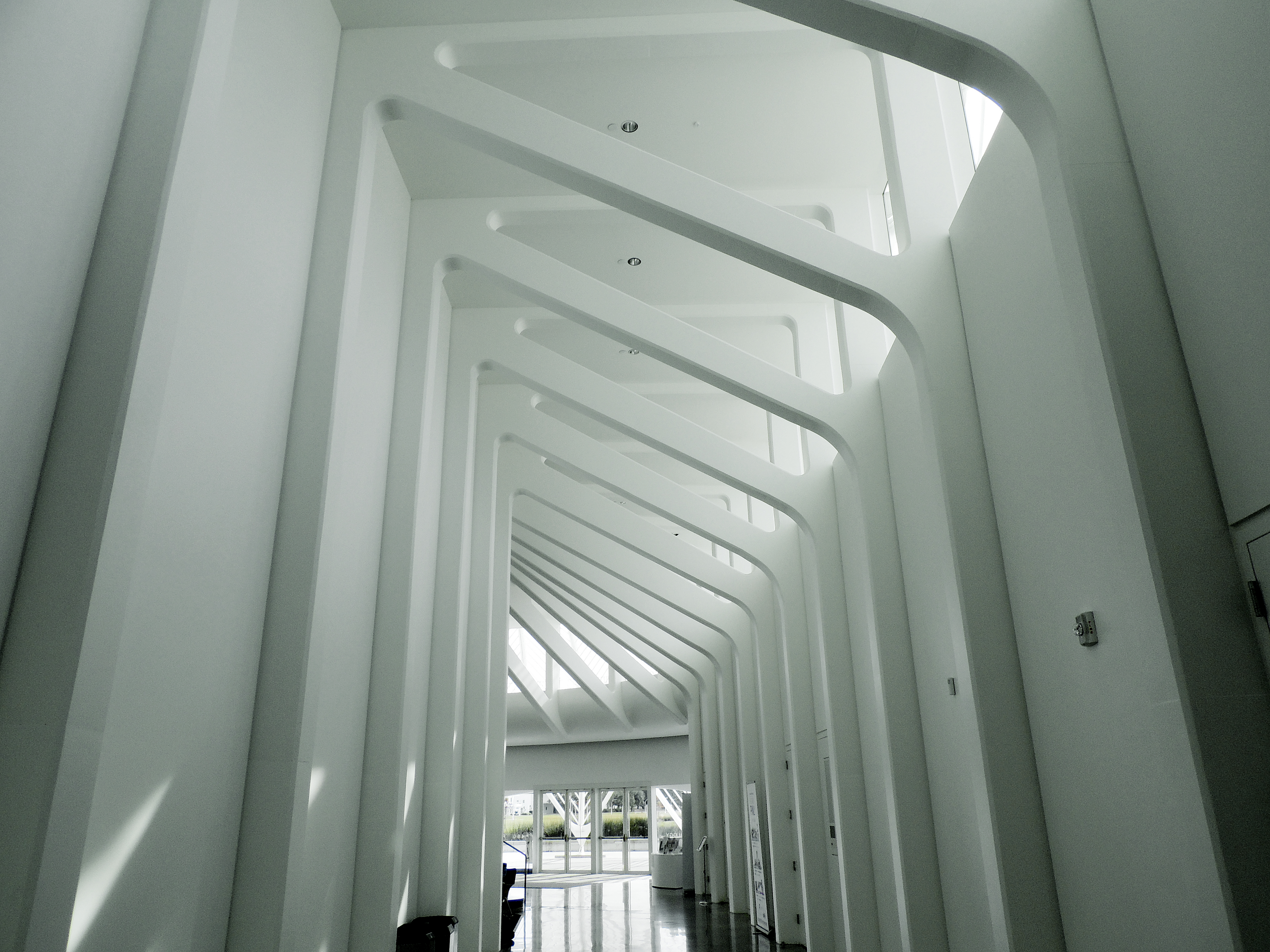
Interior of the Innovation, Science and Technology (IST) building at Florida Polytechnic University (2014)

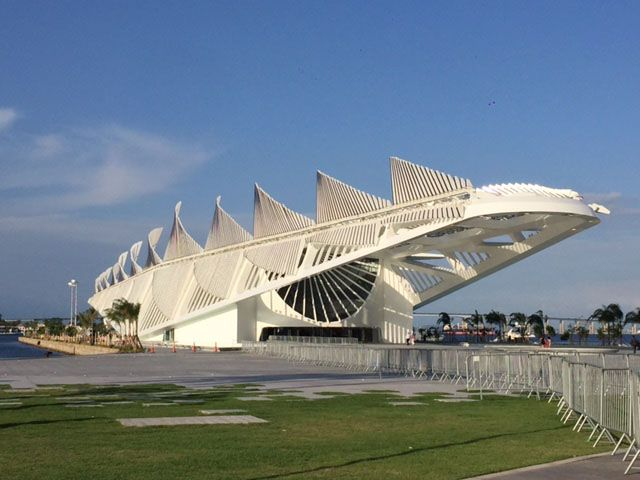
Museum of Tomorrow, Rio de Janeiro, Brazil (2015)

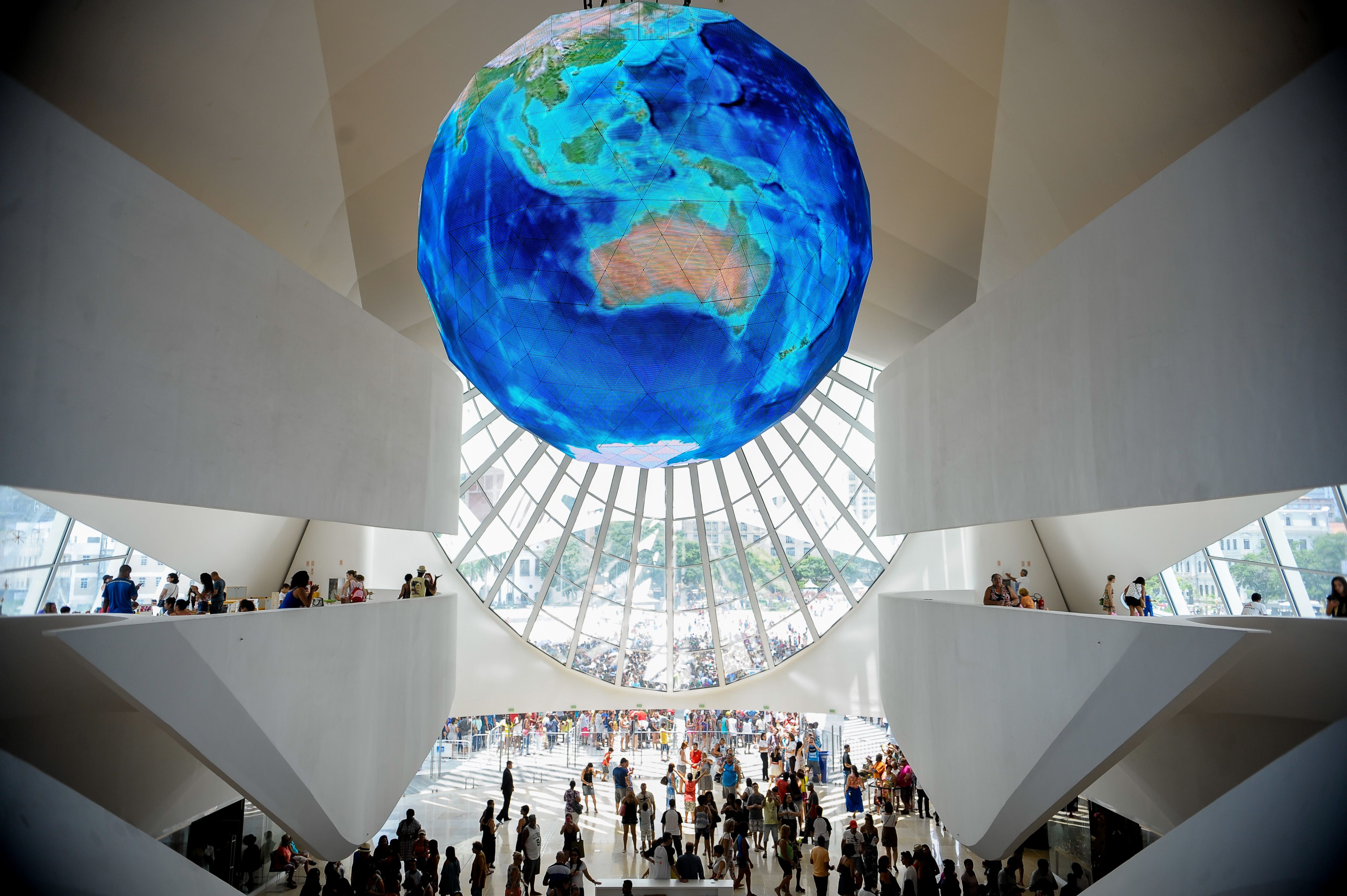
Museum of Tomorrow in Rio de Janeiro, Brazil (2015)

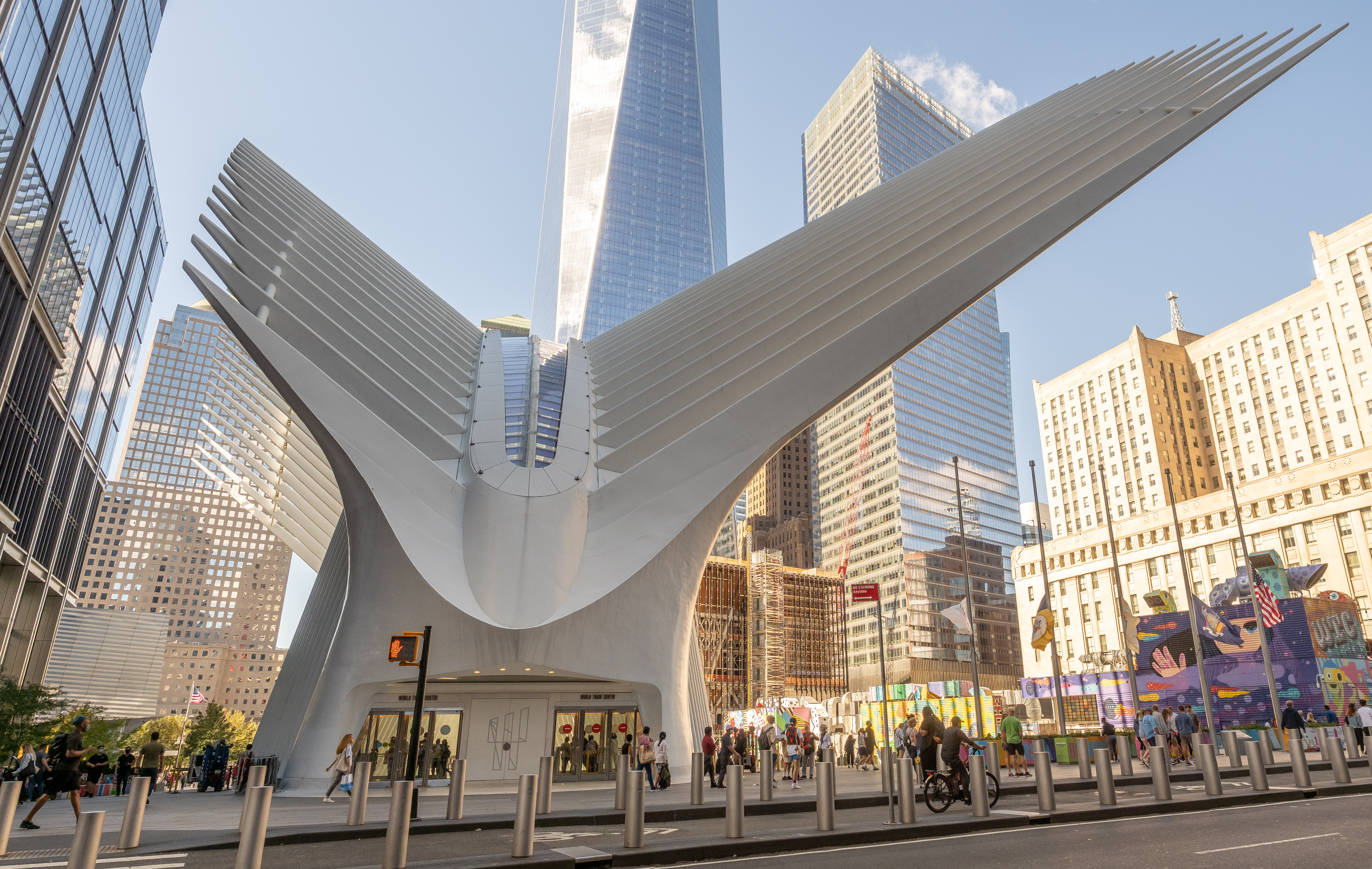
The World Trade Center Transportation Hub in New York City (2016)

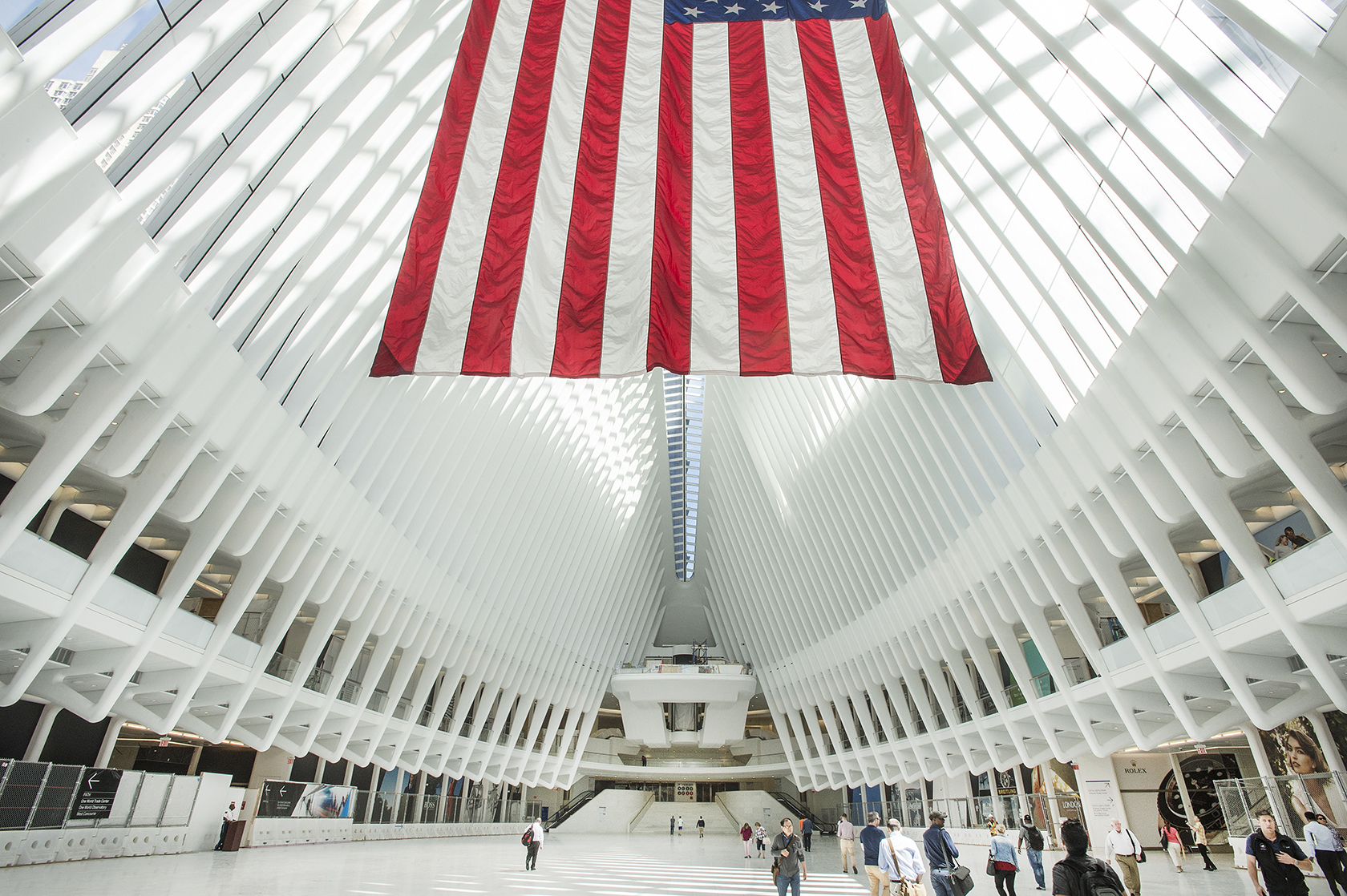
Interior of the Oculus of the World Trade Center Transportation Hub (2016)

=== Oviedo Conference Center (2000–2011) ===
The conference center and exposition hall in the Spanish city of Oviedo combines two office buildings and a hotel, covered with horizontal bands of glass and steel and perched upon curving concrete pylons, with elliptical conference center, which includes a main theater, exposition hall and seminar rooms. The Center include another signature feature of Calatrava's work; a sunscreen that was supposed to be able to fold and unfold, but was never functional. The ceiling of the concert hall is an ascending series of arcs, which echo the curving rows of seats.

=== Margaret Hunt Hill Bridge (2007–2012) and Peace Bridge (2008–2012) ===
Calatrava constructed a series of extraordinary bridges, the type of structure which originally brought him global attention, for cities around the world that wanted a symbol of modernity and daring. Among the largest and dramatic are three bridges over the Trinity River in Dallas, Texas. The first of these was the Margaret Hunt Hill Bridge, opened for traffic in March 2012. The bridge, carrying six lanes of traffic, is 209 metres (686 ft) long, with the appearance of being suspended from an arc-shaped tubular steel pylon forty stories or 136 metres (446 ft) high by fifty-eight cables, ranging in length from 119 to 196 metres (390 to 643 ft). In form, the bridge resembles one of three bridges constructed in 2005–2005 on the Autostrada A1 in Reggio Emilia, Italy. Work on the second bridge, the Margaret McDermott Bridge, began in 2011.

The Peace Bridge in Calgary, Canada, built between 2008 and 2012, is a completely different bridge in purpose, scale and design. Built across the Bow River, and designed for pedestrians and cyclists, it is a glass and steel-wrapped tube 126 metres (413 ft) long. It appears extraordinary long for a bridge with no towers or pylons to hold it up. Calatrava described the form in his own particular engineering vocabulary as "defined by a helicoidal movement, with an ovoid cross section, with two clearly materialized tangential lanes expressing an internal architectural volume."

=== Florida Polytechnic University (2009–2014) ===
The project for the new Florida Polytechnic University in Lakeland, Florida (2009–2014) gave Calatrava the opportunity to design an entire campus in a unified style. The site covers 170 acres (69 ha) of land which once contained phosphorus mines, many of which have been filled with water creating small lakes.Calatrava's plan combined several small lakes into a central lake, which serves as a setting for the central structure, the Innovation, Science, and Technology (IST) building. The eye-shaped central building has an area of 200,000 square feet on two floors, and contains all the classrooms, faculty offices laboratories and public spaces until the other buildings are completed. The building has several signature Calatrava features, including an extendable sun scene on the roof, which entirely changes the appearance of the building when deployed, and whose form changes gradually as the sun moves. The terraces of the building are covered by a curving pergola, or screen, of steel, which reduces the direct sunlight by thirty percent. Inside, the corridors and central courtyard are lit by the central skylight. Plans for the building call for the installation of 1,860 square metres (20,000 ft^{2}) of solar panels on the sunscreen to provide energy for the building. The library of the university is also distinctive; it does not have a single book; all the collection is digitized.

The structure has been called by some journalists a response to the criticism of the high price and technical flaws of some of Calatrava's earlier buildings. The review in Architecture magazine, the journal of the American Institute of Architects, reported: "The building is full of handsome and even some very impressive spaces, but none of the singularly breathtaking ones that have made Calatrava, despite his price tag, so attractive to clients looking for marketing splash to go with their museum wing or train station. It reflects serious attention to detail and the bottom line; this is the work of an architect actively trying to prove, or at least re-emphasize, his bona fides."

=== Museum of Tomorrow, Rio de Janeiro (2010–2015) ===
The Museum of Tomorrow in Rio de Janeiro, Brazil, which opened in December 2015, is part of the redevelopment of the waterfront of Rio de Janeiro, and opened in time for the 2016 Summer Olympics in that city. The building is sited on a 7,600 square metres (82,000 ft^{2}) plaza next to the harbor, and surrounded by reflecting pools. The building is cantilevered 75 metres (246 ft) over the plaza, and 45 metres (148 ft) toward the sea. and gives the impression that it is floating on the water. Calatrava wrote, "The idea is that the building feels ethereal, almost floating on the sea, like a ship, a bird or a plant." The roof is equipped with moveable screens that adjust to the movements of the sun. The interior design is what Calatrava calls "archetypal" and simplified, to allow for exhibits in a greater variety of forms and sizes.

The museum also includes a number of ecological features; water from the sea is used to regulate the temperature inside the building, and to refill the surrounding reflecting pools. The Guardian described it as "an other-worldly edifice that looks like a cross between a solar-powered dinosaur and a giant air conditioning unit", and declared "it must already rank as one of the world's most extraordinary buildings."

=== WTC Hub, New York City (2003–2016) ===
Calatrava designed the WTC Transportation Hub in New York City at the rebuilt World Trade Center at the site of the September 11 attacks in 2001. The new station connects the regional trains of the new PATH with the subway and other local transportation, and also has a large retail mall, replacing commercial space destroyed in the attack. The above-ground "oculus" of the station, made of glass and steel, is oval-shaped, and is 35 metres (115 ft) long and 29 metres (95 ft) high. According to Calatrava, it resembles "a bird flying from the hands of a child". The "Wings" of the above-ground structure were originally designed to move upward to a maximum height of 51 metres (167 ft) to form a double screen 51 metres (167 ft) high, but this feature had to be dropped to meet new security standards. The main hall of the station is 10 metres (33 ft) underground, and the tracks of the PATH system on another level 8 metres (26 ft) below. The underground station was originally designed so that its roof would open entirely in good weather, but this feature also had to be dropped due to its cost and space limitations.

The WTC Hub has been controversial because of its cost (4 billion dollars, twice the original estimate, and the most expensive railway station ever built) and its delays (seven years on 3 March 2016, seven years behind schedule). More than $1 billion of its cost went to administrative expenses and the decision to build around the 1 train of the New York City Subway. Michael Kimmelman, the architecture critic of the New York Times, praised the soaring upward view inside the Oculus, but condemned the building's cost, "scale, monotony of materials and color, preening formalism and disregard for the gritty urban fabric."

== Controversy and criticism ==
After years of praise and commendation, in 2013 some of Calatrava's projects began to draw criticism on the grounds of their cost, delays, and functional problems. Many of these criticisms were packaged together in an article by Suzanne Daley in the New York Times on 13 September 2013, entitled "Santiago Calatrava collects critics as well as fans."

Daley wrote: "...in numerous interviews, other architects, academics and builders say that Mr. Calatrava is amassing an unusually long list of projects marred by cost overruns, delays and litigation. It is hard to find a Calatrava project that has not been significantly over budget. And complaints abound that he is indifferent to the needs of his clients. In 2013 a Dutch councillor in Haarlemmermeer, near Amsterdam, urged his colleagues to take legal action because the three bridges the architect designed for the town cost twice the budgeted amount and then millions more in upkeep since they opened in 2004."

Much of the criticism focused on the City of Arts and Sciences in Valencia, originally budgeted for about $405 million. Ignacio Blanco, the leader of a small opposition party in Valencia, blamed Calatrava of spending nearly three times the original budget, and accused the region of paying him approximately $127 million for his work, though the complex was originally lacking elevators for the disabled, and the opera house had 150 seats with obstructed views. In 2013 Calatrava sued his critic for defamation and won, however because the judge ruled that, although the website presented "objective truths", its name "Calatrava te la clava" (a rhyme meaning "Calatrava bleeds you dry") was "insulting and degrading".

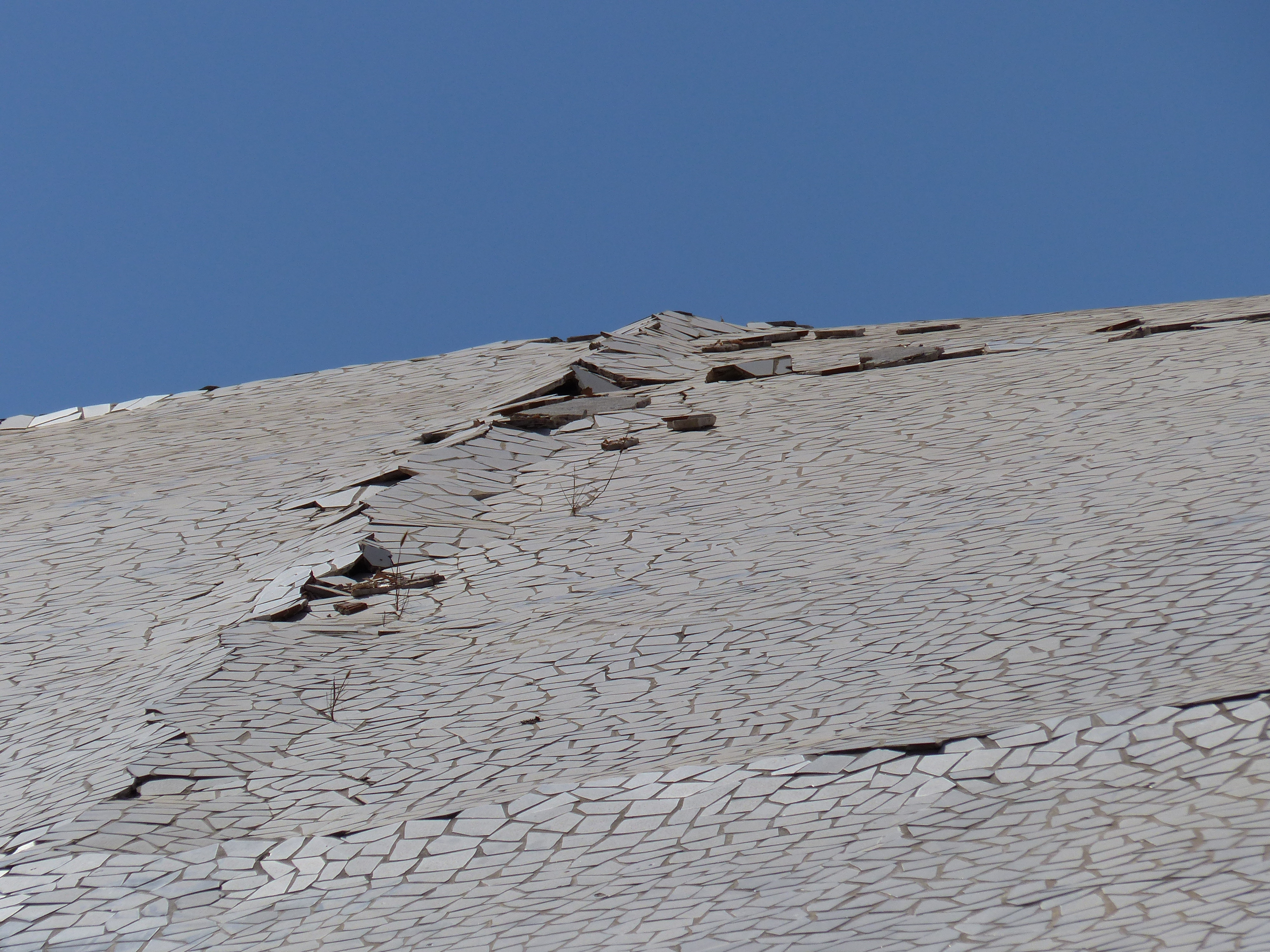
Missing and ill-fitting tiles on the wall of the Auditorio de Tenerife in 2015.

Some of the problems with Calatrava's projects have been caused by unusual design choices and insufficient testing. The glass tiles on the floor of his bridge in Bilbao became slippery in the rain, causing an increased number of claims for injuries and forcing the installation of a black anti-slip carpet on the decking, which blocked the view of the river through the walkway. The metal arches he put over some landscaped gardens sometimes overheated in the sunshine, baking the vines that were supposed to grow on them. The Caja Madrid Obelisk is a kinetic sculpture with an undulating movement. However the maintenance costs are so high that it has been static since months after its inauguration in 2010. The aluminum and wood covering of a winery in Spain leaked water, interfering with the winemaking and requiring extensive repairs. The ceramic tiles on the surface of the opera house in Valencia, placed as a tribute to Antonio Gaudi, buckled in the heat because concrete and ceramics expand and contract at different rates when temperatures change. Calatrava was sued for the cost of repairs on the bridge in Venice and has been condemned in court. Also the trencadís tiles of the Tenerife Auditorium buckle and lose adhesion. The fixing is delayed by disputes between the Calatrava studio and the building companies.

=== WTC Hub ===
Much of the criticism focused on Calatrava's WTC Hub, which was completed in 2016 for a cost of $4 billion, twice what was expected and seven years behind schedule. Calatrava was paid a fee of 80 million dollars. Some of the additional cost and delay was due to additions and modifications to the original plan by the project owners, the Port Authority of New York and New Jersey, rather than the architect. Calatrava's original entry pavilion was scaled back for security reasons and the mechanism for opening the roof to the gallery below was eliminated because of budget and space restraints.

Even before it opened the station was a target of criticism: the New York Post described the station in 2014 as it was being built as "a self-indulgent monstrosity" and "a hideous waste of public money". Michael Kimmelman, architecture critic for The New York Times, referred to the structure as "a kitsch stegosaurus". New York magazine referred to it in 2015 as it neared completion as a "Glorious Boondoggle". The New York Post editorial board also described the station when it opened in 2016 as the "world's most obscenely overpriced commuter rail station – and possibly its ugliest", comparing the Oculus to a "giant gray-white space insect".

The Hub also had its defenders. Jimmy Stamp of The Guardian wrote: "I despised the new World Trade Center transportation hub before I even saw it. It's $2bn over budget, has suffered from construction problems and design compromises, it's seven years late and still incomplete, and its architect, Santiago Calatrava, has left a trail of lawsuits and angry clients around the world....But when I was standing on the marble floors in its enormous, gleaming central concourse two stories below street level, staring up at a clear blue sky between bone-white ribs vaulting 160ft over my head, I, like Jonah in the whale, repented – at least for the moment....We deserve grand expressions of our artistic and technological capabilities. We deserve public spaces that inspire. The Oculus is deeply flawed, but I appreciate its aspiration and grandeur.... The Oculus presents a more optimistic vision, one based less on present realities and more on future possibilities. Less Blade Runner, more Star Trek. By the time we get to that future, whichever one it may be, the delays and the cost and the controversies will be forgotten, but we will be left with a luminous great hall in the heart of downtown New York."

=== Athens Olympic Sports Complex ===
In October 2023 the Greek government decided to shut down the Athens Olympic Stadium and Velodrome, which both have a roof built by Calatrava, due to stability issues posing a threat for attendees and workers.

== Style and influences ==
Calatrava has never described himself as a follower of any particular school or movement of architecture. Critics have claimed that a number of influences can be seen in his work. In the journal of the American Institute of Architects, Christopher Hawthorne wrote about his design for Florida Polytechnic University, which he called "an example of Calatrava's architectural approach and creative sensibility distilled, for better and worse, to its essence. There are all the usual influences on view—the Eero Saarinen forms rendered in the Richard Meier, FAIA, palette—and they are remarkably legible and easy to parse here." Some other critics see his work as a continuation of expressionism. Asked about critics who classified him into different schools, Calatrava responded, "Architectural critics have not yet passed from a state of perplexity about my work."

Calatrava himself observed that he was particularly influenced by the work of engineers such as the Swiss Robert Maillart (1872–1940), whose work inspired him to seek simple forms which could create an emotional response. Calatrava defined his objective this way in 2016 in a book about his work: "My major interest is the introduction of a new formal vocabulary, composed of forms adapted to our time."

Calatrava, a sculptor, has also spoken frequently about the connection between sculpture and architecture in his work. "In sculpture, I have often used spheres, cubes and other simple forms often connected with my knowledge of engineering." He noted that his Turning Torso building had originally been conceived as a work of sculpture, and he praised the liberties taken by Frank Gehry and Frank Stella in creating sculptural art, but he also noted the differences. In 1997 he wrote that "architecture and sculpture are two rivers in which the same water flows. Think of sculpture as a pure plastic art while architecture is a plastic art which is submitted to function, taking into consideration the human scale." Calatrava also noted the influence of the sculptor Auguste Rodin, citing Rodin's words in his 1914 book Cathedrals of France: "The sculptor only achieves the greatness of expression in concentrating his attention on harmonic contrasts of light and shadow, exactly as an architect does."

Movement is also an important element in the architecture of Calatrava. He noted that many 20th century sculptors, such as Alexander Calder, made sculptures that moved. He wrote his own university thesis on "The Flexibility of three-dimensional structures," and described how objects, by moving, could shift from three dimensions to two and even to one. Moving elements which folded and expanded became an important element of almost all of his projects. "Architecture itself moves", he told a biographer, "and, with a little chance, becomes a magnificent ruin".

== Artworks ==
Calatrava is also a sculptor and painter. Some of his architectural works, most notably the Turning Torso in Malmö, Sweden, were originally works of sculpture. In 2006, the Metropolitan Museum of Art in New York City held a special one-man exhibition of Calatrava's drawings, sculpture, and architectural models, entitled Santiago Calatrava: Sculpture Into Architecture.

In 2012, the Hermitage Museum in St. Petersburg held an exhibition of his work and this was followed up by an exhibition at the Vatican Museum in Rome. Eight of his sculptures were displayed along Park Avenue in New York City in the spring of 2015, between 52nd and 55th Streets.

In 2024, the first comprehensive overview of Calatrava's art was written by Nick Mafi and published by Hirmer.

== Notable works ==
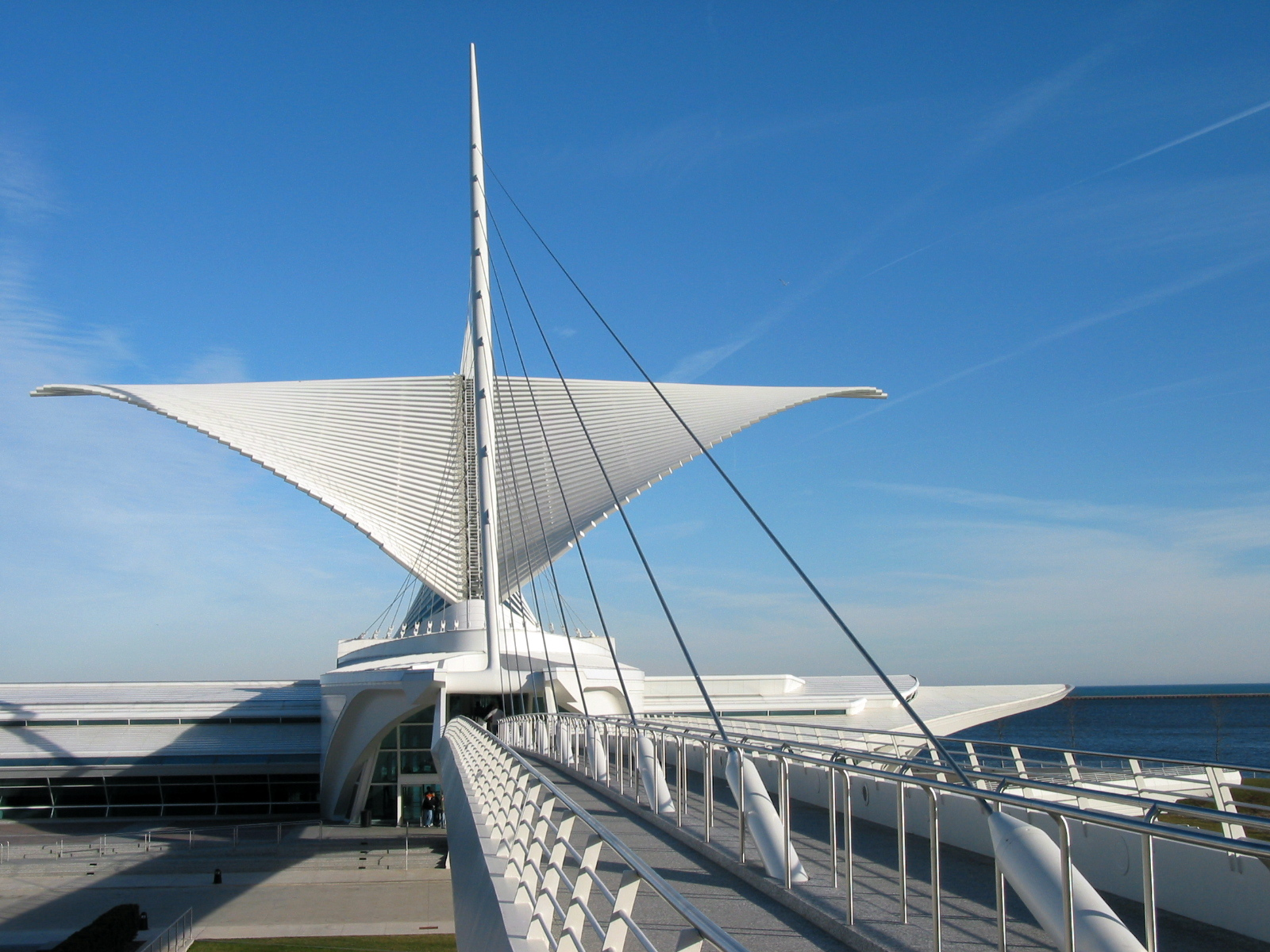
Milwaukee Art Museum in Milwaukee, Wisconsin, U.S. (2001)

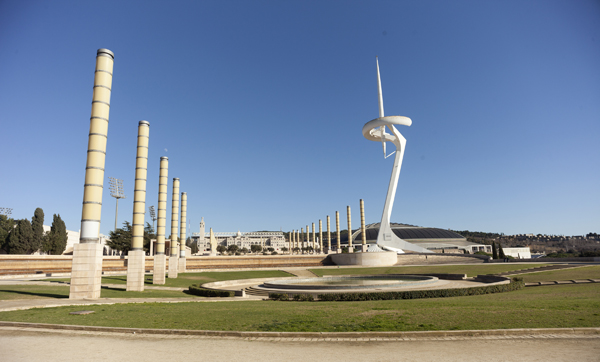
Montjuïc Communications Tower, Barcelona, Catalonia, Spain (1992)

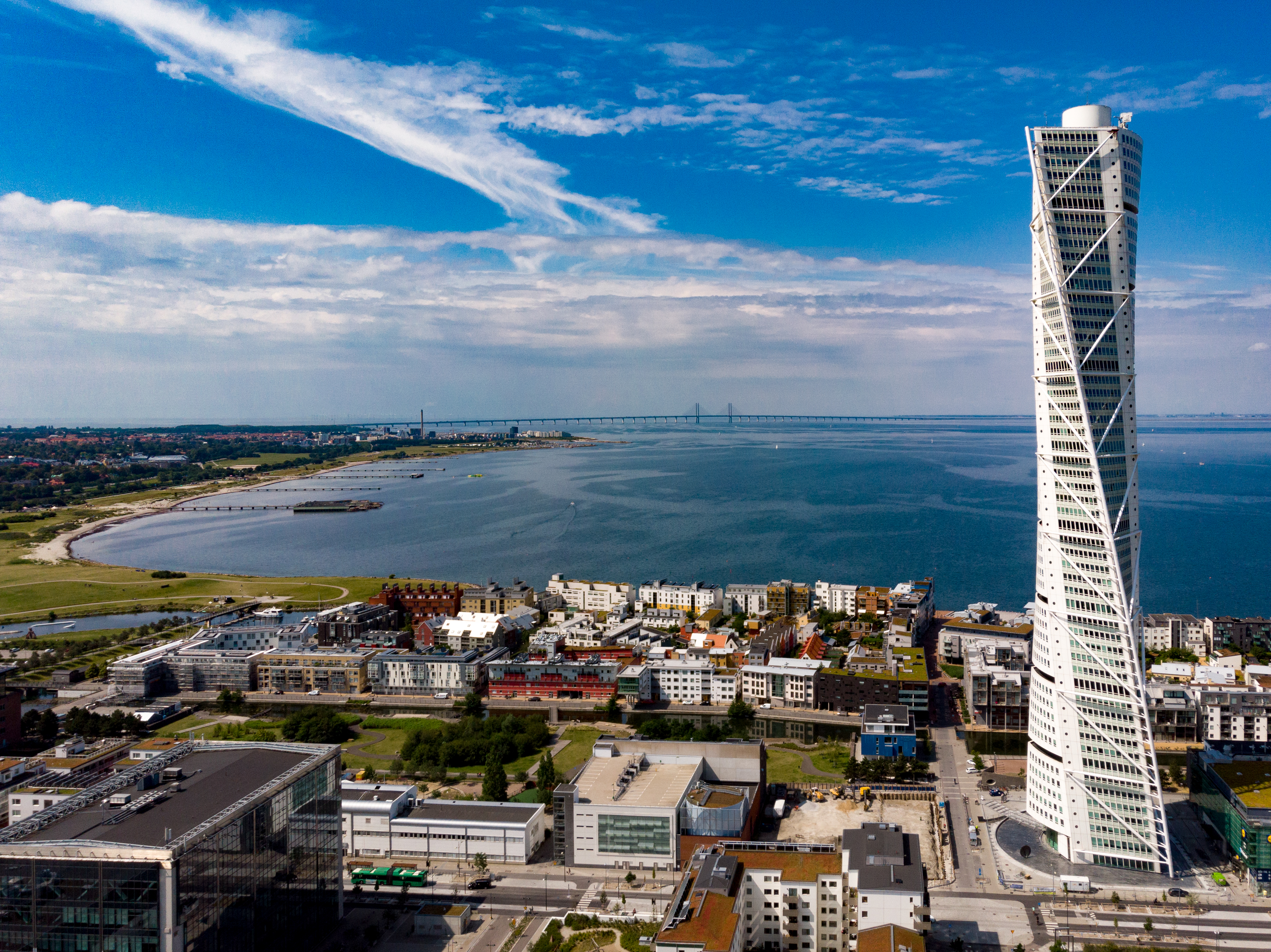
Turning Torso in Malmö, Sweden (2005)

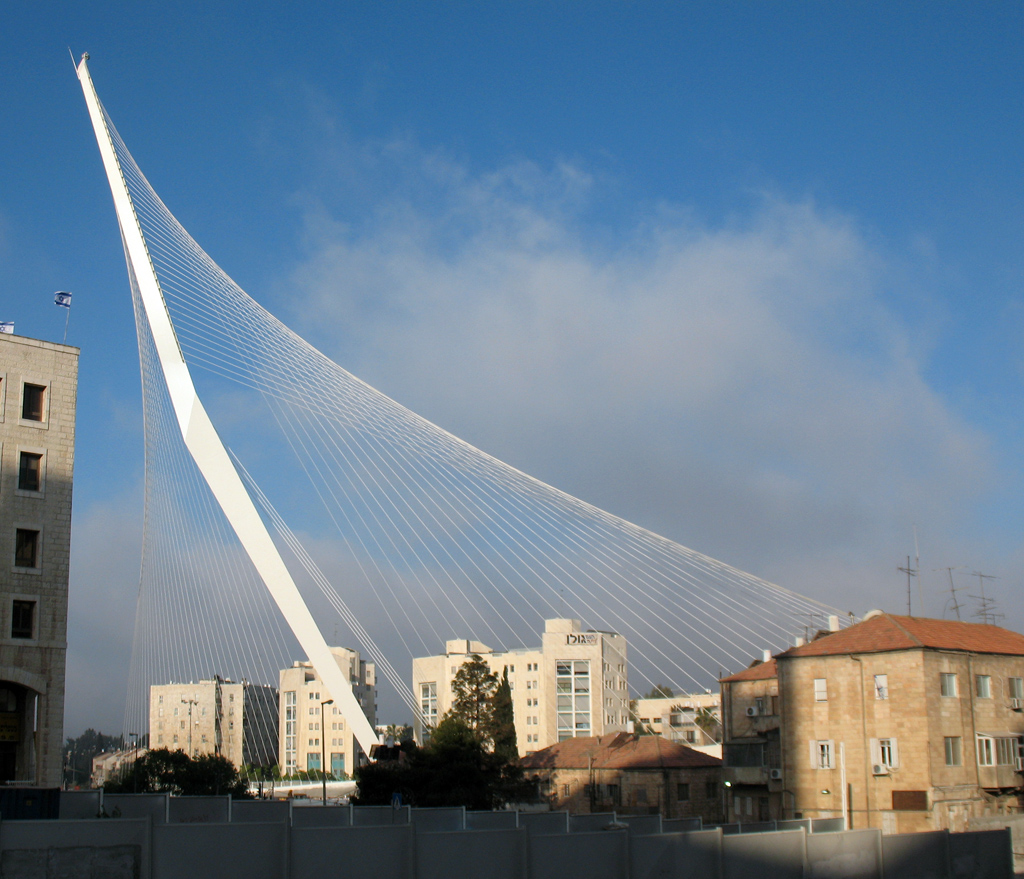
Chords Bridge for pedestrians and train in Jerusalem (2008)

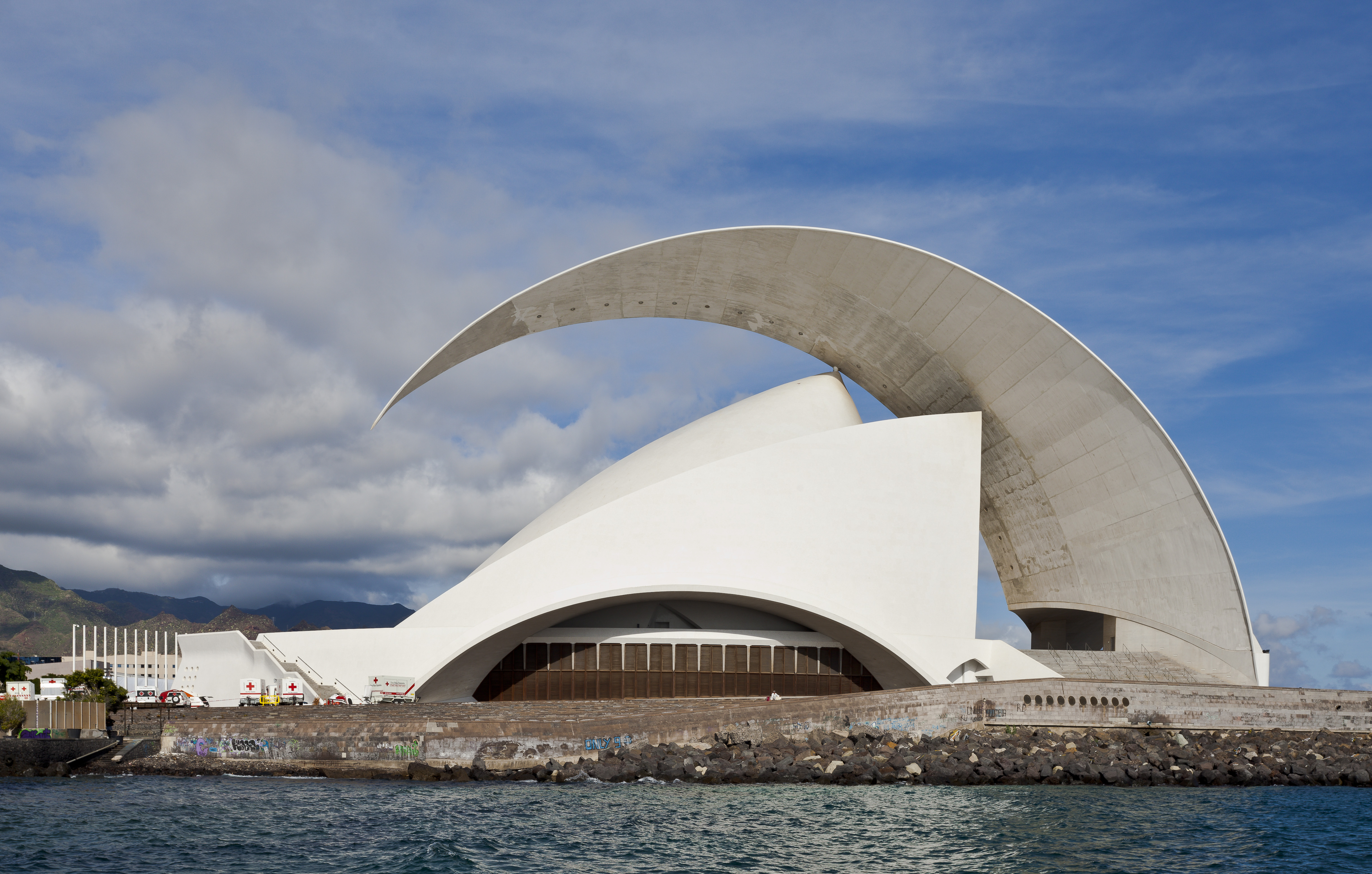
Auditorio de Tenerife, Santa Cruz de Tenerife, Spain (2003)

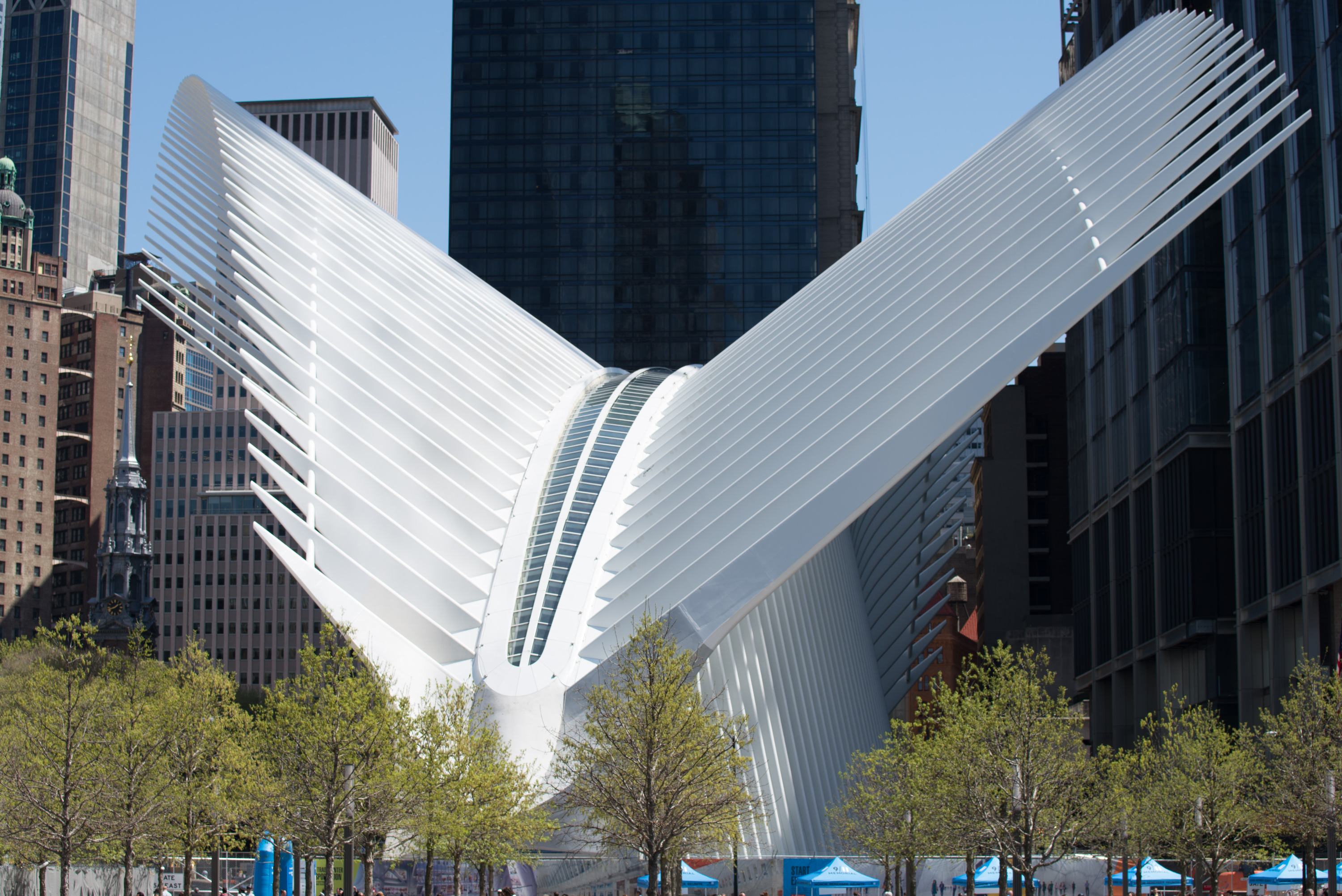
World Trade Center Transportation Hub, New York City (2016)

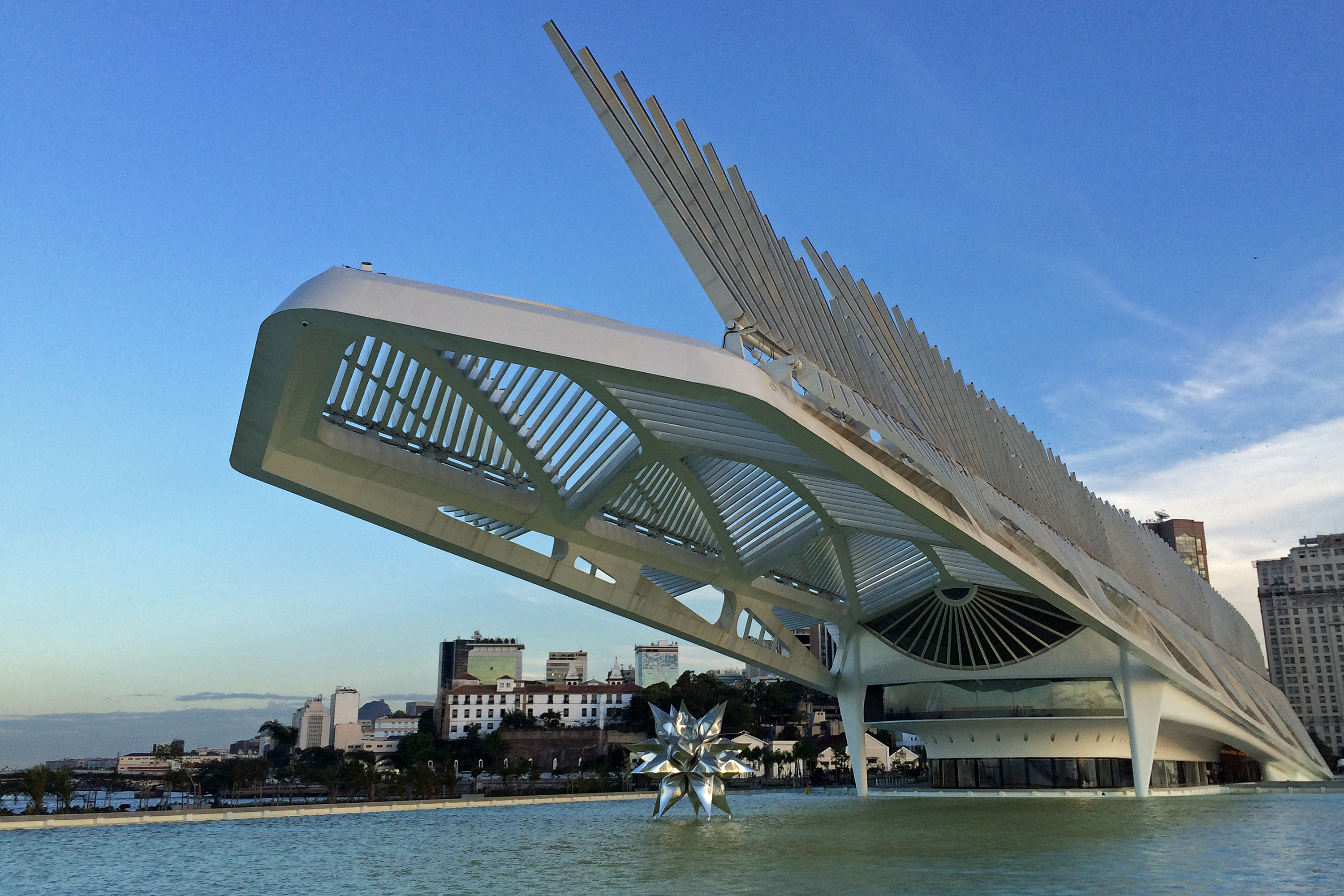
Museum of Tomorrow in Rio de Janeiro, Brazil (2015)

=== Completed ===
- 1983–84, Jakem Steel Warehouse, Munchwilen, Switzerland
- 1983–85, Ernsting Warehouse, Coesfeld, Germany
- 1983–88, Wohlen High School, Wohlen, Switzerland
- 1983–90, Stadelhofen Railway Station, Zurich, Switzerland
- 1983–89, Hall of Lucerne railway station, Lucerne, Switzerland
- 1984–87, Bac de Roda Bridge, Barcelona, Spain
- 1984–88, Barenmatte Community Center, Suhr, Switzerland
- 1986–87, Tabourettli Theater, Basel, Switzerland
- 1986–88, 9 De Octubre Bridge, Valencia, Spain
- 1987–92, Allen Lambert Galleria (in Brookfield Place), Toronto, Ontario, Canada,
- 1987–96, Buchen Housing Estate, Würenlingen, Switzerland
- 1989–98, Emergency Services Centre, St. Gallen, Switzerland
- 1989–94, Lyon-Saint-Exupéry TGV Station, Lyon, France
- 1989–91, La Devesa Footbridge, Ripoll, Spain
- 1989–95, Puerto Bridge, Ondarroa, Spain
- 1989–96, Bohl Bus and Tram stop, St. Gallen, Switzerland
- 1991–95, Alameda Bridge and Metro Station, Valencia, Spain
- 1991–96, Oberbaum Bridge Renovation, Berlin, Germany
- 1992, Alamillo Bridge, Seville, Spain
- 1992, Lusitania Bridge, Mérida, Spain
- 1992, Montjuic Communications Tower at the Olympic Ring, Barcelona, Spain
- 1992, World's Fair, Kuwaiti Pavilion, Seville, Spain
- 1994, Mimico Creek Bridge, Humber Bay Park, Toronto, Ontario
- 1994, Kronprinzenbrücke, Berlin, Germany
- 1994–97, Campo Volantin Footbridge, Bilbao, Spain
- 1992–95, Llonja de Sant Jordi, Alcoy (Alicante), Spain
- 1995, Trinity Bridge, footbridge over River Irwell in Manchester and Salford, Greater Manchester, England
- 1996–2009, City of Arts and Sciences, Valencia, Spain
- 1996, Centro Internacional de Ferias y Congresos de Tenerife, Santa Cruz de Tenerife, Tenerife, Canary island, Spain
- 1996–2000, Pont de l'Europe, Orléans, France
- 1997, Pfalzkeller Gallery, St. Gallen, Switzerland
- 1998, Gare do Oriente, Lisbon, Portugal
- 1999, New York Times Capsule, U.S.A.
- 1999, Puente del Hospital, Murcia, Spain
- 2000, New terminal at Bilbao Airport, Bilbao, Spain
- 2001, Milwaukee Art Museum, Milwaukee, Wisconsin, US
- 2001, Puente de la Mujer, in the Puerto Madero barrio of Buenos Aires, Argentina
- 2001, Bodegas Ysios, Laguardia, Spain
- 2002, Wave, in Dallas, Texas at the Southern Methodist University Meadows Museum
- 2003, James Joyce Bridge, bridge over River Liffey, Dublin, Ireland
- 2003, Auditorio de Tenerife, the architect's first performing arts facility, Santa Cruz de Tenerife, Spain
- 2004, redesign of Athens Olympic Sports Complex, Athens, Greece
- 2004, Katehaki Footbridge, Athens, Greece
- 2004, Sundial Bridge at Turtle Bay, Redding, California, US
- 2004, Three bridges (called Harp, Cittern and Lute) spanning the main canal of the Haarlemmermeer, Netherlands
- 2004, University of Zurich, "Bibliothekseinbau" library remodelling, Zurich, Switzerland
- 2005, The bridge connecting the Avnat shopping mall and the Rabin Medical Center (Beilinson) in Petah Tikva, Israel
- 2005, Turning Torso, Malmö, Sweden
- 2007, Three bridges on the A1 Motorway and Milan–Bologna high-speed railway, Reggio Emilia, Italy
- 2008, Chords Bridge at the entrance to Jerusalem, a light rail bridge, Israel
- 2008, Ponte della Costituzione footbridge from Piazzale Roma over the Grand Canal, Venice, Italy
- 2008–2009, Technion Obelisk, monument on the Technion campus in Haifa, Israel
- 2009, Liège-Guillemins railway station in Liège, Belgium
- 2009, Samuel Beckett Bridge, bridge over River Liffey, Dublin, Ireland
- 2009, Caja Madrid Obelisk, Madrid, Spain
- 2011, Palacio de Congresos de Oviedo, Oviedo, Spain, [Spanish wiki: es:Palacio de Congresos de Oviedo]
- 2011, Palacio de Exposiciones y Congresos, Oviedo, Spain
- 2012, Margaret Hunt Hill Bridge, Dallas, Texas, US
- 2012, Peace Bridge, Calgary, Alberta, Canada
- 2013, Medio Padana Station on the Milan–Bologna high-speed railway, Reggio Emilia, Italy
- 2014, Florida Polytechnic University, Lakeland, Florida, US
- 2015, Museu do Amanhã, Rio de Janeiro, Brazil
- 2016, World Trade Center Transportation Hub, New York City
- 2018, San Francesco di Paola Bridge, Cosenza, Italy
- 2021, Margaret McDermott Bridge, Dallas, Texas, U.S.
- 2021, UAE Pavilion at EXPO 2020, Dubai, UAE
- 2022, St. Nicholas Greek Orthodox Church, New York City
- 2024, Mons railway station in Mons, Belgium

=== Under construction/proposed ===
In Europe

- City of Sport, University of Rome Tor Vergata, Italy
- Peninsula Place, Greenwich, London (1 billion dollar project for three towers and a footbridge)

In the Middle East

- Sharq Crossing, Doha, Qatar: project for three bridges and two tunnels (postponed until after 2022)
- Dubai Creek Tower, Dubai, UAE (ground broken, scheduled for completion in 2025; in competition for world's tallest structure)

In East Asia

- Yuan Ze University Building (Taoyuan International Conference Center), Taoyuan, Taiwan.

=== Abandoned ===
- Chicago Spire, Chicago, Illinois, United States
- 80 South Street, New York City, United States

== Recognition ==
Calatrava has received numerous awards for his design and engineering work. In 1988, he was awarded with the Fazlur Khan International Fellowship by the SOM Foundation. In 1990, he received the "Médaille d'Argent de la Recherche et de la Technique", in Paris. In 1992 he received the prestigious Gold Medal of the Institution of Structural Engineers. In 1993, the Museum of Modern Art in New York held a major exhibition of his work called "Structure and Expression". In 1998 he was elected to become a member of "Les Arts et Lettres", in Paris. In 2005 he received the Gold Medal from the American Institute of Architects (AIA).

In 2005, Calatrava was awarded the Eugene McDermott Award by the Council for the Arts of MIT.

He is also a Senior Fellow of the Design Futures Council.

Calatrava has received a total of twenty-two honorary degrees in recognition of his work. In 2013, Calatrava was awarded an honorary doctorate from Georgia Institute of Technology, an award that has only been given to a small number of people.

=== Honorary degrees ===
- 1993 Honorary Degree from Universidad Politecnica de Valencia
- 1994 Honorary Degree from Heriot-Watt University
- 1994 Honorary Degree from University of Seville
- 1995 Honorary Degree from University of Salford
- 1996 Honorary Degree from University of Strathclyde
- 1997 Honorary Degree from Milwaukee School of Engineering
- 1997 Honoris Causa Degree awarded by Delft University of Technology
- 1999 Honoris Causa Degree from University of Cassino
- 1999 Honorary Degree from Lund University
- 1999 Honorary Degree from Universita degli Studi di Ferrara
- 2004 Honorary Degree from Technion – Israel Institute of Technology
- 2005 Honorary Degree from Southern Methodist University
- 2006 Honorary Engineering Degree from Rensselaer Polytechnic Institute
- 2005 Honorary Degree from Aristotle University of Thessaloniki
- 2007 Honorary Engineering Degree from Columbia University
- 2008 Honorary Degree from Tel Aviv University
- 2009 Honorary Degree from Oxford University
- 2009 Honorary Degree from University Camilo Jose Cela
- 2010 Honorary Degree from Universite de Liège
- 2012 Honorary Degree from Pratt Institute
- 2013 Honorary Doctoral Degree from Georgia Institute of Technology
- 2016 Honorary Doctoral Degree from Instituto Politécnico Nacional (IPN) in México

=== Other honours ===
- 2011: On 10 December, Calatrava was appointed a member of the Pontifical Council for Culture for a five-year renewable term by Pope Benedict XVI.
- 2004: Calatrava received the Golden Plate Award of the American Academy of Achievement presented by Awards Council member Quincy Jones during the International Achievement Summit in Chicago.
- 2004: James Parks Morton Interfaith Award

== Personal life ==
Calatrava resides in Zurich and New York City. Two of Calatrava's sons have completed advanced degrees in engineering from the Fu Foundation School of Engineering and Applied Science at Columbia University in New York City. His other son obtained a law degree from Columbia University and practices at the law firm Kirkland & Ellis LLP in Chicago, Illinois. Calatrava has one daughter who completed advanced degrees in computer science and data analytics at Columbia University in New York City.

== Bibliography ==
- Jodidio, Philip (2016). Calatrava (in French). Taschen. ISBN 978-3-8365-3564-9.
- Bony, Anne (2012). L'Architecture Moderne (in French). Larousse. ISBN 978-2-03-587641-6.
- Taschen, Aurelia; Taschen, Balthazar (2016). L'Architecture Moderne de A à Z (in French). Bibliotheca Universalis. ISBN 978-3-8365-5630-9.
- Prina, Francesca; Demaratini, Demartini (2006). Petite encyclopédie de l'architecture (in French). Solar. ISBN 2-263-04096-X.
- Hopkins, Owen (2014). Les styles en architecture- guide visuel (in French). Dunod. ISBN 978-2-10-070689-1.
- De Bure, Gilles (2015). Architecture contemporaine- le guide (in French). Flammarion. ISBN 978-2-08-134385-6.
