= Mariánský most =

Bridge in Ústí nad Labem

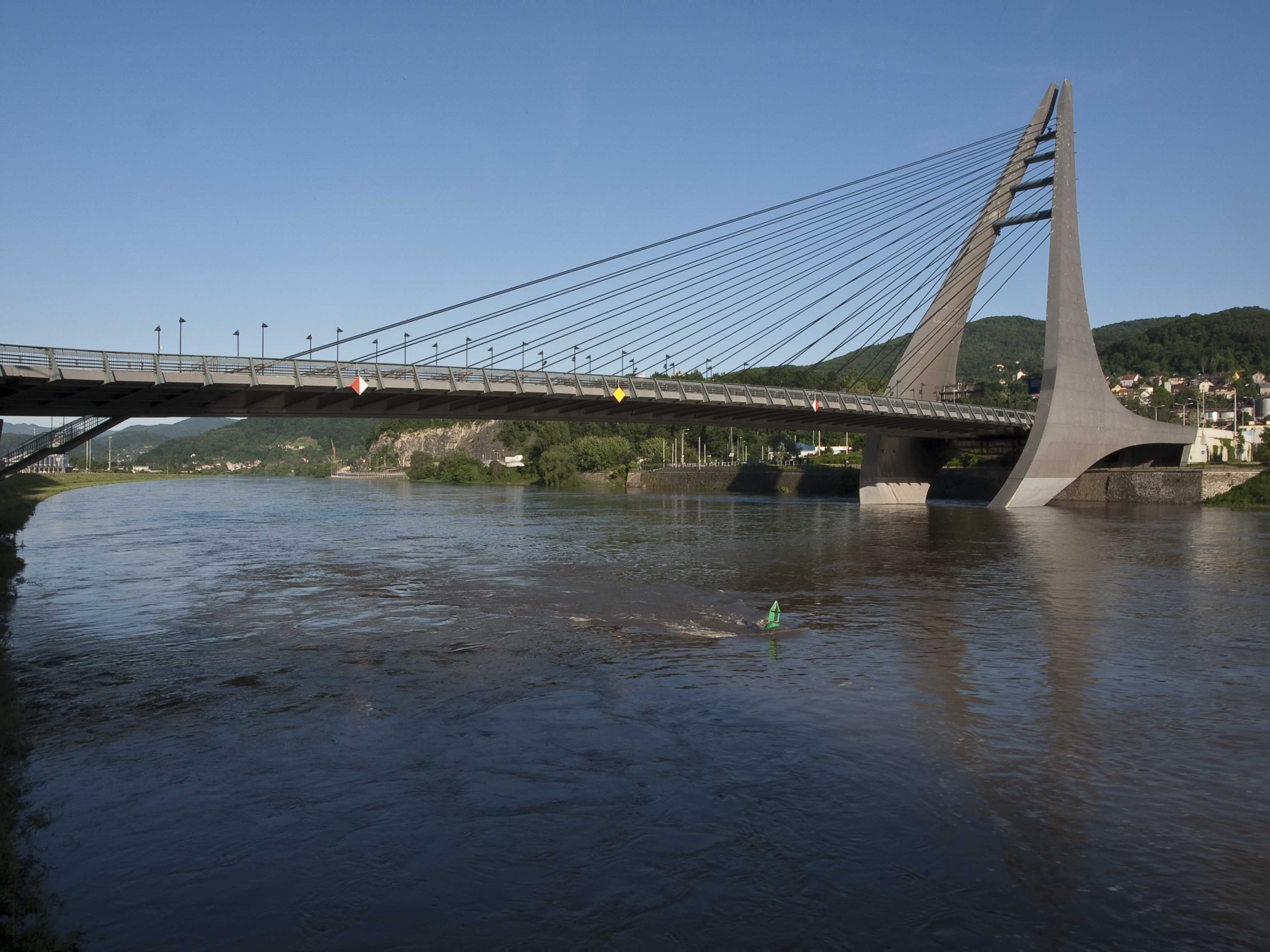
- Mariánský most from the left bank of the Elbe
- Coordinates: 50°39′37″N 14°03′13″E
- Crosses: Elbe
- Locale: Ústí nad Labem
- Official name: Mariánský most

Characteristics
- Design: 2 pylons, 15 cables each
- Height: 60 metres (200 ft) (pylon)
- Longest span: 179 metres (587 ft)

History
- Construction start: 1993
- Construction end: 1998
- Opened: 1998

Location
- Interactive map of Mariánský most

Mariánský most is a cantilever spar cable-stayed bridge for road transport, bicycles and pedestrians in the city of Ústí nad Labem, Czech Republic. It was opened in 1998 and is the city's third bridge. It was designed by the architect Roman Koucký.

== Construction ==
The bridge has a cantilever spar composed of 2 pylons, each of them containing 15 steel cables that hold the bridge deck. The length of bridge deck is 179 m and the height of pylons is 60 m. The weight of the bridge is 3500 tons. The used material is the steel and ferroconcrete.

== See also ==
- Alamillo Bridge, Seville, Spain
