= Cantilever spar cable-stayed bridge =

Type of cable-stayed bridge

Cantilever-spar Cable-stayed Bridge
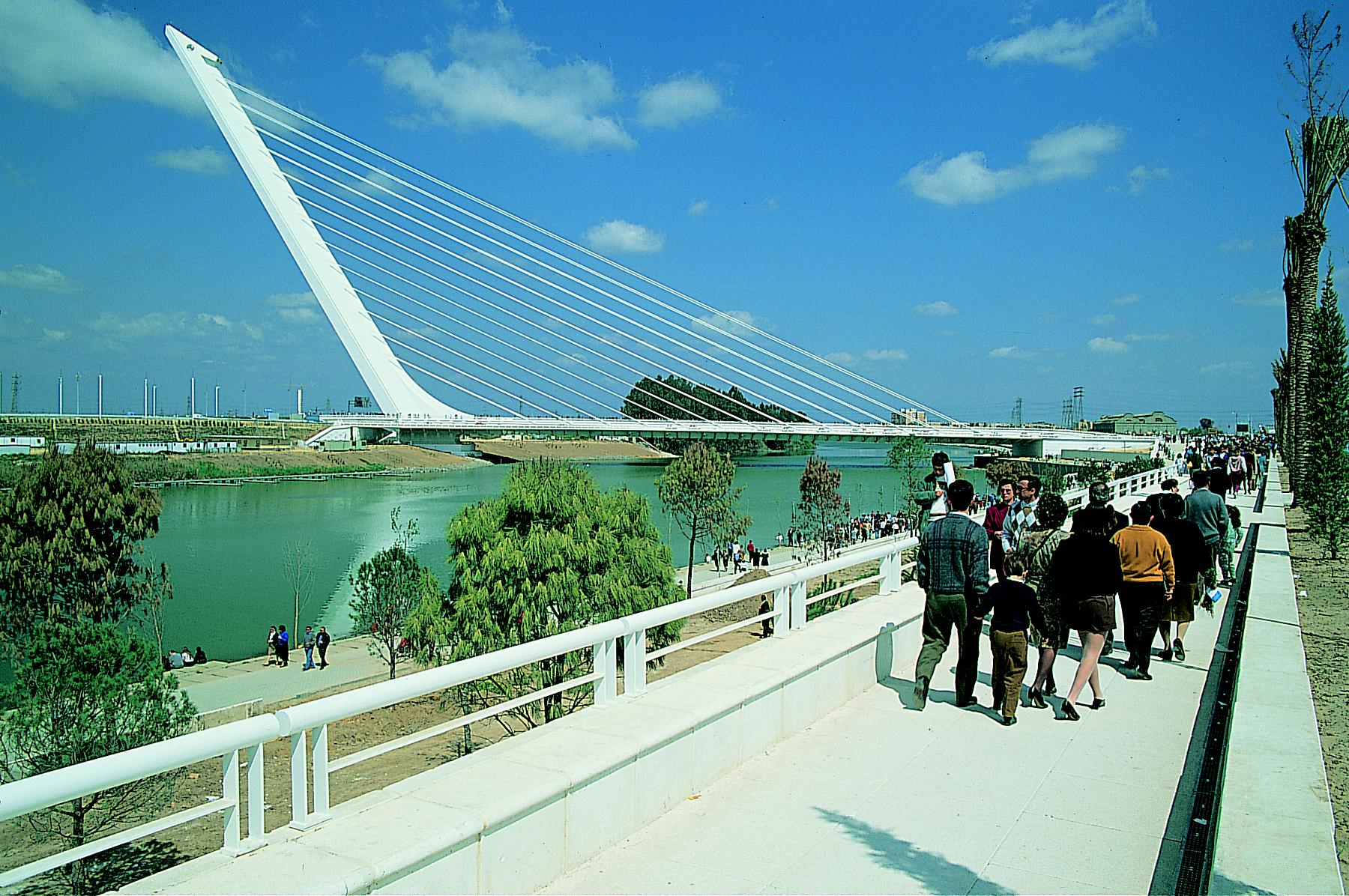
- Puente del Alamillo
- Ancestor: Cantilever bridge, cable-stayed bridge
- Related: Side-spar cable-stayed bridge
- Descendant: None
- Carries: Pedestrians, Light Rail
- Span range: Short to Medium
- Material: Steel, prestressed concrete
- Movable: One example can swing
- Design effort: High
- Falsework required: No

A cantilever spar cable-stayed bridge is a modern variation of the cable-stayed bridge. This design has been pioneered by the structural engineer Santiago Calatrava in 1992 with the Puente del Alamillo in Seville, Spain. In two of his designs the force distribution does not depend solely upon the cantilever action of the spar (pylon); the angle of the spar away from the bridge and the weight distribution in the spar serve to reduce the overturning forces applied to the footing of the spar. In contrast, in his swinging Puente de la Mujer design (2002), the spar reaches toward the cable supported deck and is counterbalanced by a structural tail. In the Assut de l'Or Bridge (2008), the curved backward pylon is back-stayed to concrete counterweights.

== Of this type by Santiago Calatrava ==
- Puente del Alamillo, Seville, Spain, 1992 (backward cantilever)
- Trinity Bridge, Manchester, United Kingdom, 1995 (backward cantilever)
- Puente de la Mujer, Buenos Aires, Argentina, 2002 (forward cantilever with gate-swing opening)
- Sundial Bridge at Turtle Bay, Redding CA, USA, 2004 (backward cantilever with glass decking)
- Chords Bridge, Jerusalem, Israel, opened 2008, light rail operative since 2011 (single-sided angled cantilever side-spar)
- Assut de l'Or Bridge, Valencia, Spain, opened 12 December 2008 (backward curved pylon, back-stayed cantilever)
- Samuel Beckett Bridge, Dublin, Ireland, opened 10 December 2009 (single-sided forward curved back-stayed pylon, evoking a harp)
- Ponte di San Francesco da Paola, Cosenza, Italy, opened 26 January 2018 (backward pylon)
- Signature Bridge, New Delhi, India, opened 4 November 2018 (Asymmetrical cable stayed pylon bridge)

== Others of this type ==
- Puente Atirantado (sometimes called Puente de la Unidad or Viaducto de la Unidad), opened in 2003, is a cable-stayed bridge that crosses the Río Santa Catarina and joins San Pedro Garza García with Monterrey. Although impressive and elegant, its construction was highly controversial due to its cost, its design (very similar to the one by Santiago Calatrava), and the fact that the river it crosses is dry.
- Mariánský most – in Ústí nad Labem, Czech Republic. (1998)
- Erasmusbrug – by Ben van Berkel, in Rotterdam Netherlands.
- Signature Bridge, Delhi, India, opened 5 November 2018.(Unique design of cables in a combinations of radial and semi-harp arrangement)
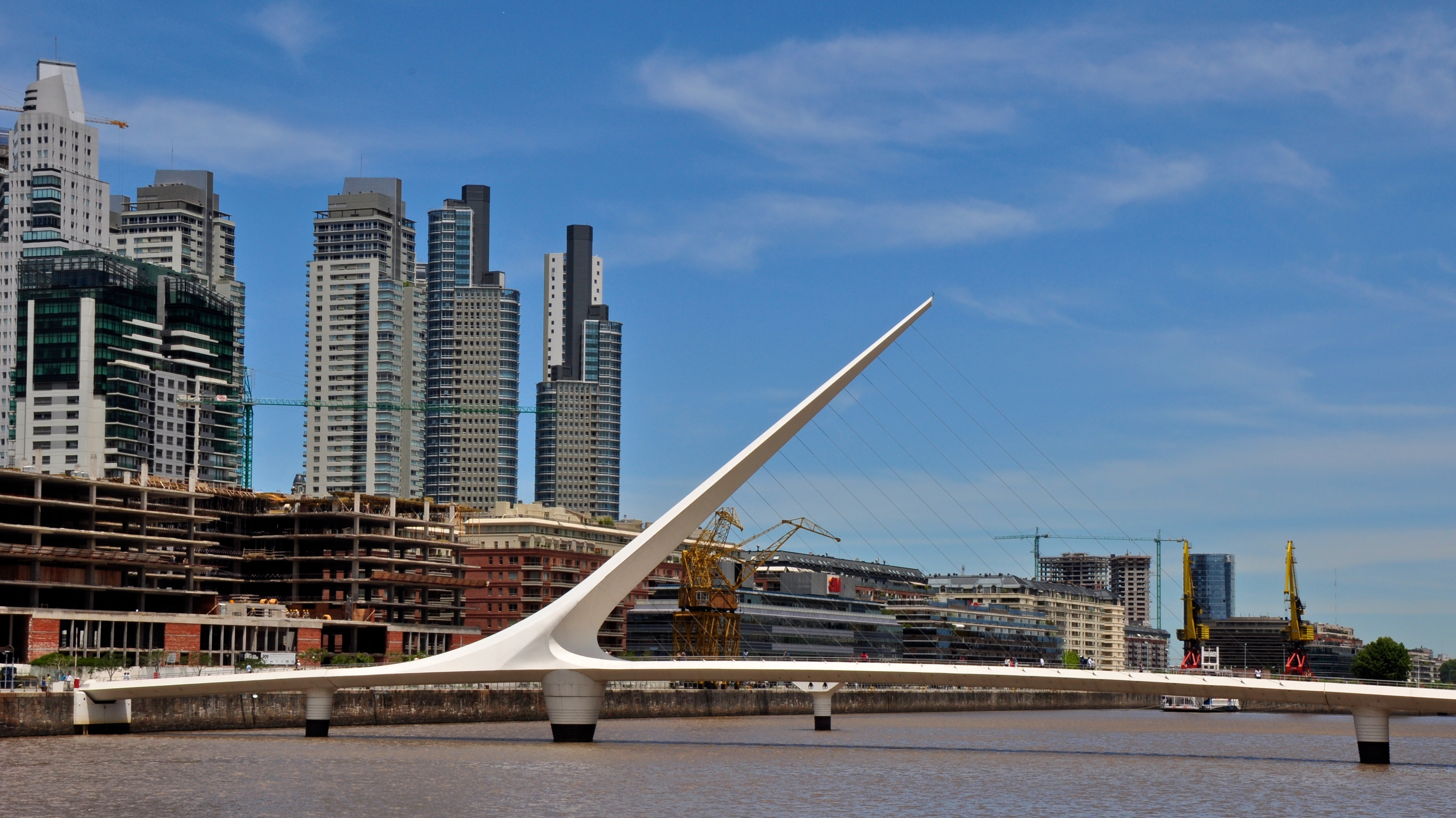
Puente de la Mujer, Puerto Madero (Argentina)

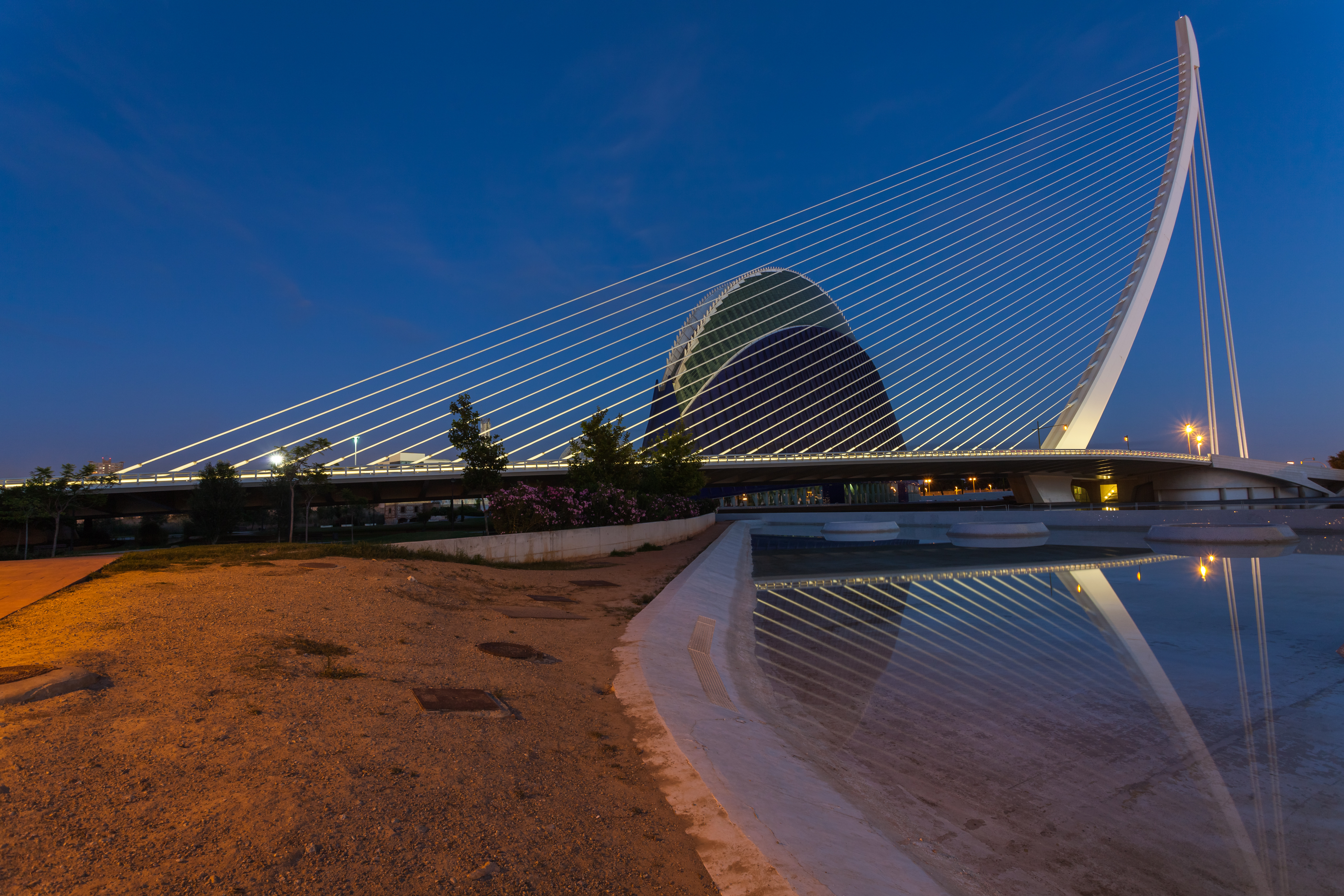
Assut de l'Or Bridge, Valencia, Spain

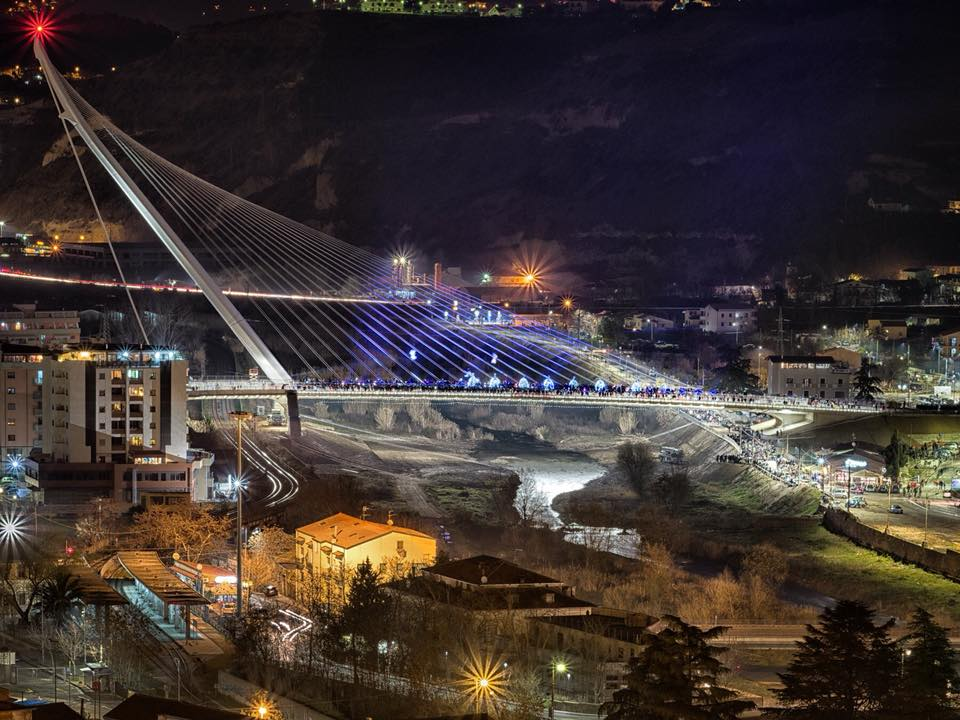
Ponte di San Francesco da Paola, Cosenza, Italy

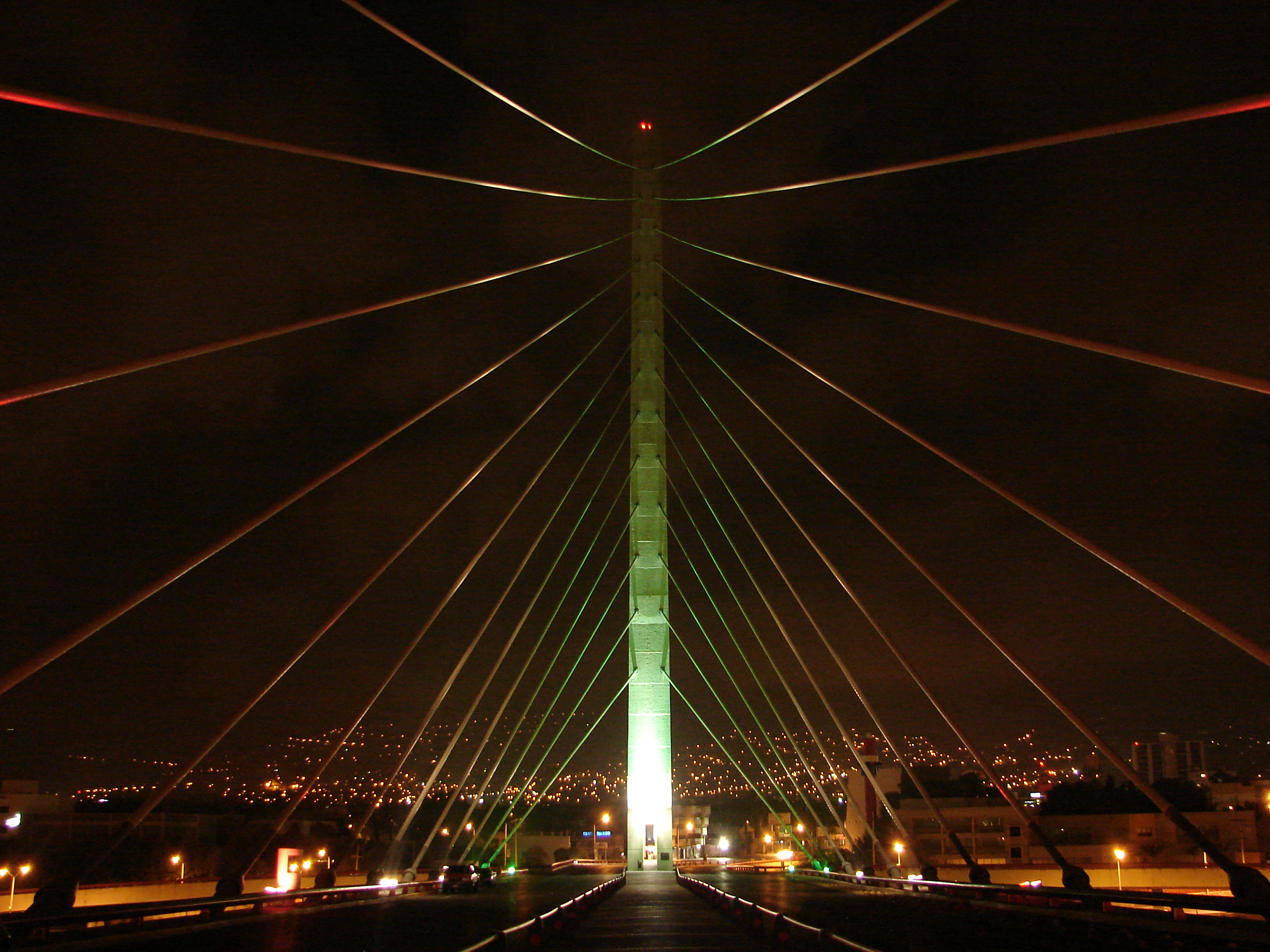
El Puente Atirantado. Monterrey, Mexico

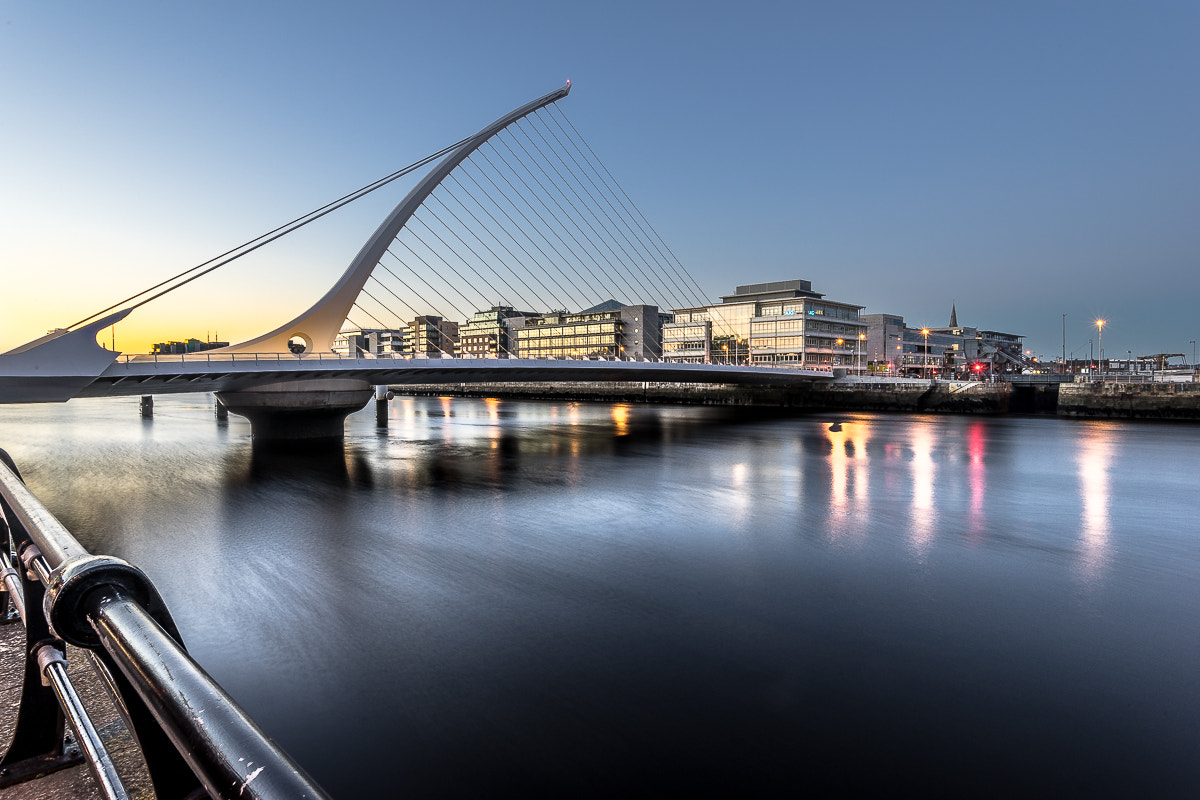
Samuel Beckett Bridge, Dublin, Ireland

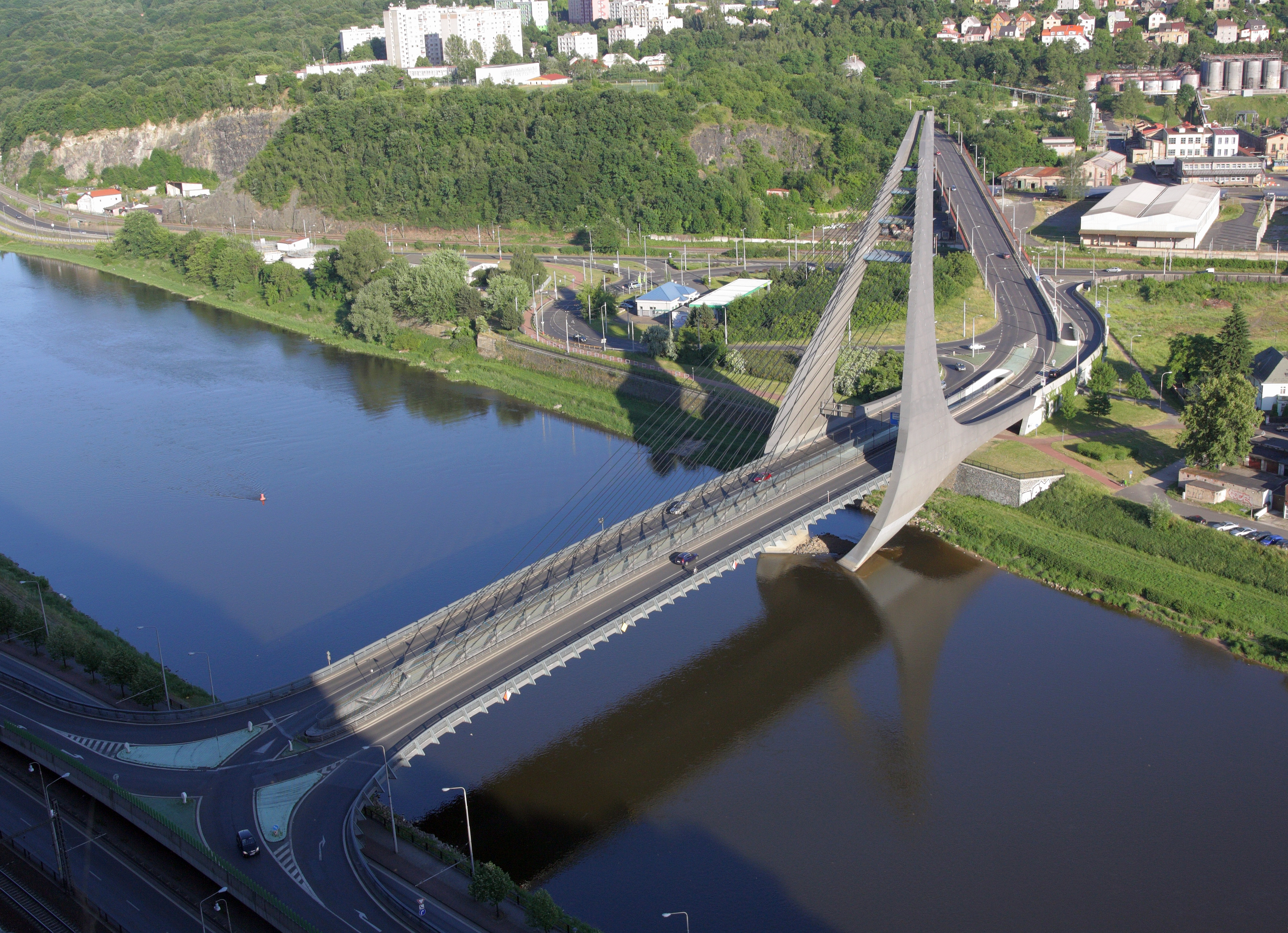
Mariánský most, Ústí nad Labem, Czech Republic

== See also ==
- Bridge – A directory of bridge types
- Cable-stayed bridge – The ancestor of this type
- Side-spar cable-stayed bridge – A related type
