= Puente de la Mujer =

Footbridge in Buenos Aires, Argentina

Woman's Bridge Puente de la Mujer
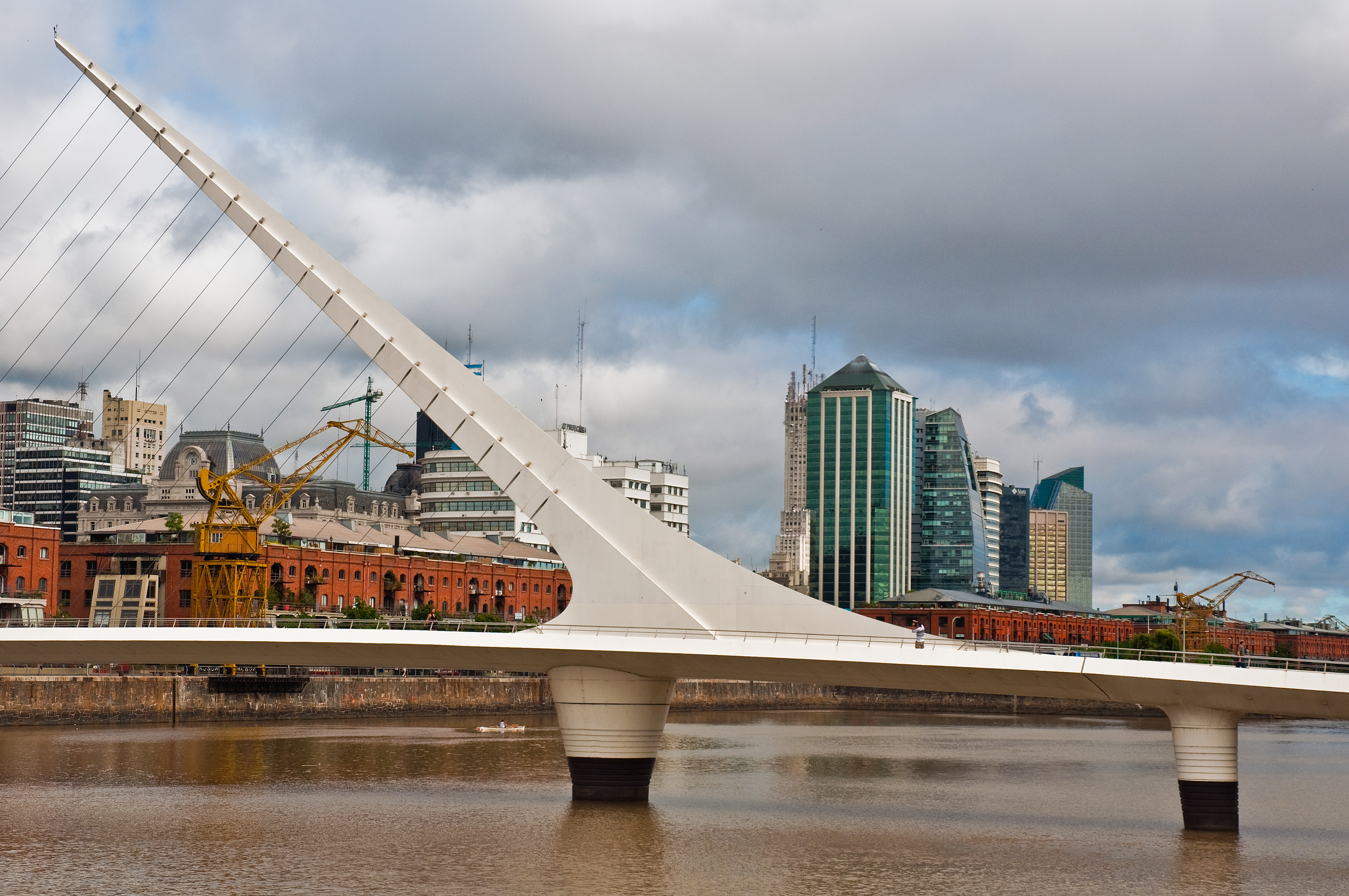
- Location in Buenos Aires
- Coordinates: 34°36′29″S 58°21′54″W
- Crosses: Dock 3 in Puerto Madero
- Locale: Buenos Aires, Argentina

Characteristics
- Design: Forward cantilever with gate-swing opening
- Material: Steel, reinforced concrete
- Total length: 170 metres
- Width: 6.20 metres
- Height: 34 metres
- Longest span: 102.5 metres

History
- Designer: Santiago Calatrava
- Construction start: 1998
- Opened: 20 December 2001

Statistics
- Daily traffic: pedestrian

Location
- Interactive map of Woman's Bridge

The Puente de la Mujer (Spanish for "Woman's Bridge") is a rotating footbridge for Dock 3 of the Puerto Madero commercial district of Buenos Aires, Argentina. It is of the cantilever spar cable-stayed bridge type and is also a swing bridge, but somewhat unusual in its asymmetrical arrangement. It has a single mast with cables suspending a portion of the bridge which rotates 90 degrees in order to allow water traffic to pass. When it swings to allow watercraft passage, the far end comes to a resting point on a stabilizing pylon.

== Design ==
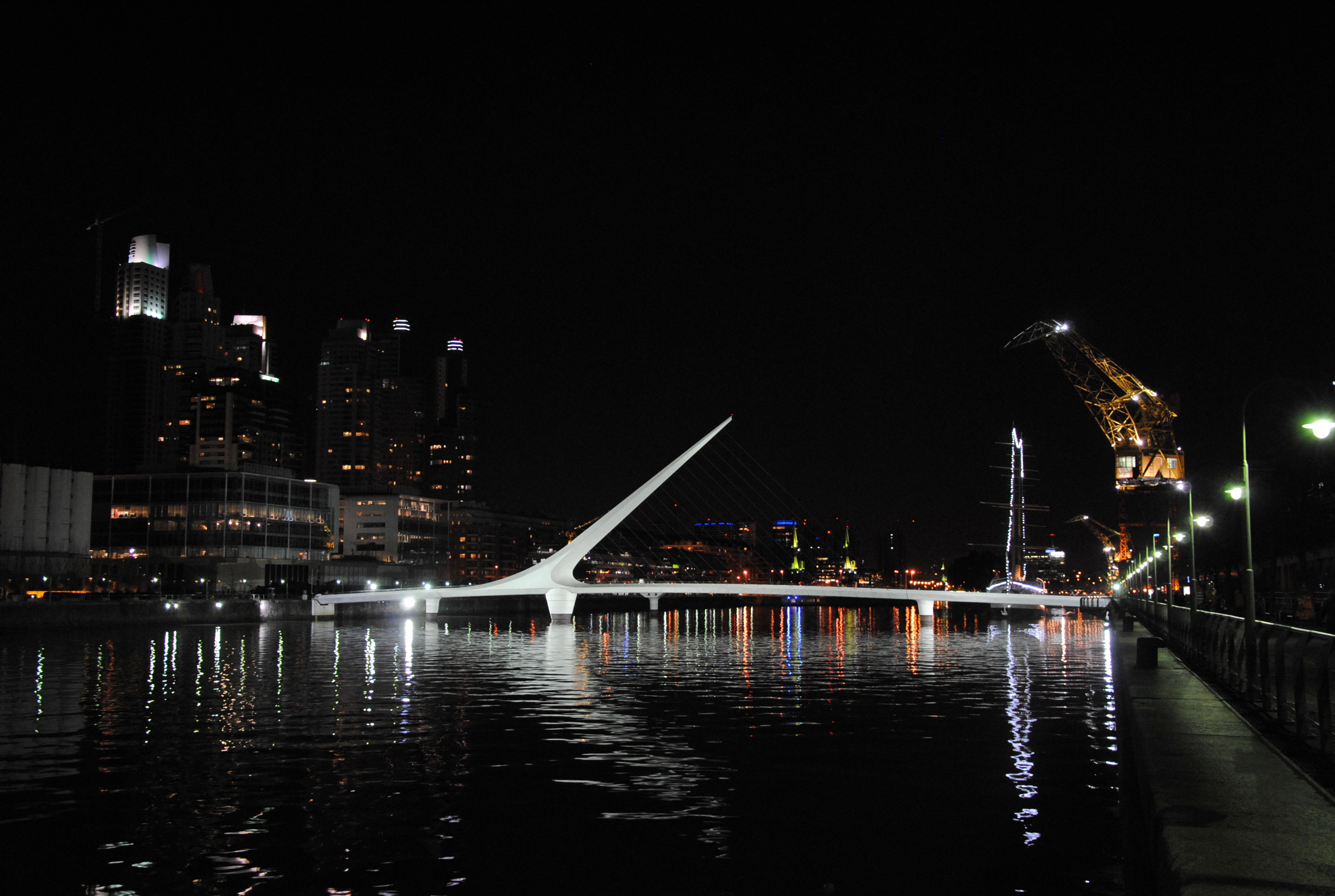
The short pylon seen below and beyond the cantilever spar is the resting place when the bridge is open. The ship beyond is the museum ship Presidente Sarmiento.

Designed by the Spanish architect and structural engineer Santiago Calatrava on a plan very similar to a 251-metre bridge over the Guadalquivir River in Seville, Spain (1992) and a 213-metre bridge over the Sacramento River in Redding, California (2004), it has a forward-, rather than a reverse-angled cantilever, as is seen in those bridges. The bridge is the first of only two Calatrava structures in Latin America. The architect has described the design as representing the image of a couple dancing the tango.

The 170-metre pedestrian bridge weighs 800 tonnes, is 6.20 m wide and is divided into two fixed portions, 25 m and 32.50 m long respectively, and a middle section of 102.5 m that rotates on a white concrete pylon, allowing vessels to pass in less than two minutes. This central section is supported by a steel "needle" with a concrete core, about 34 m high. The "needle," inclined at a 39° angle, anchors suspension cables which support the central span. A computer system at the eastern end of the bridge operates the turning mechanism when required.

A number of streets in the Puerto Madero district have women's names, thus giving the bridge its name.

== History ==
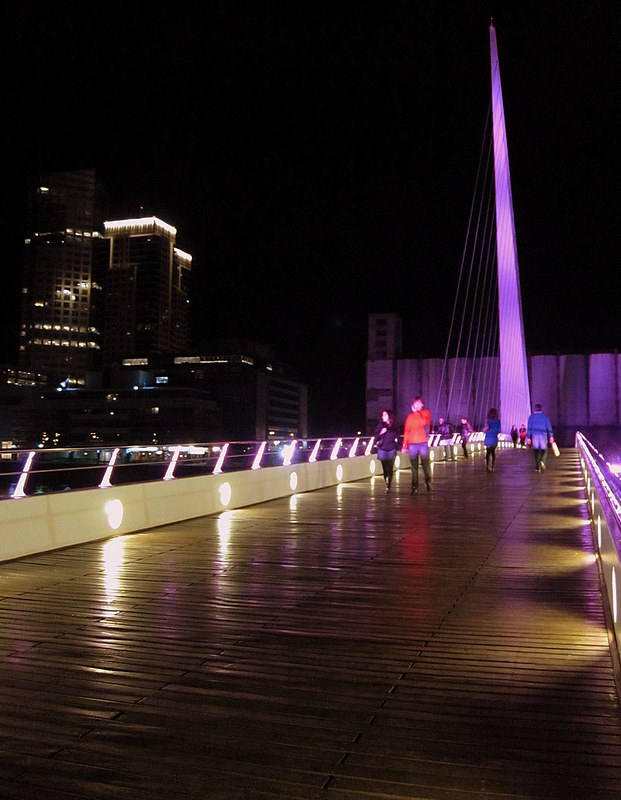
Crossing of the bridge at night.

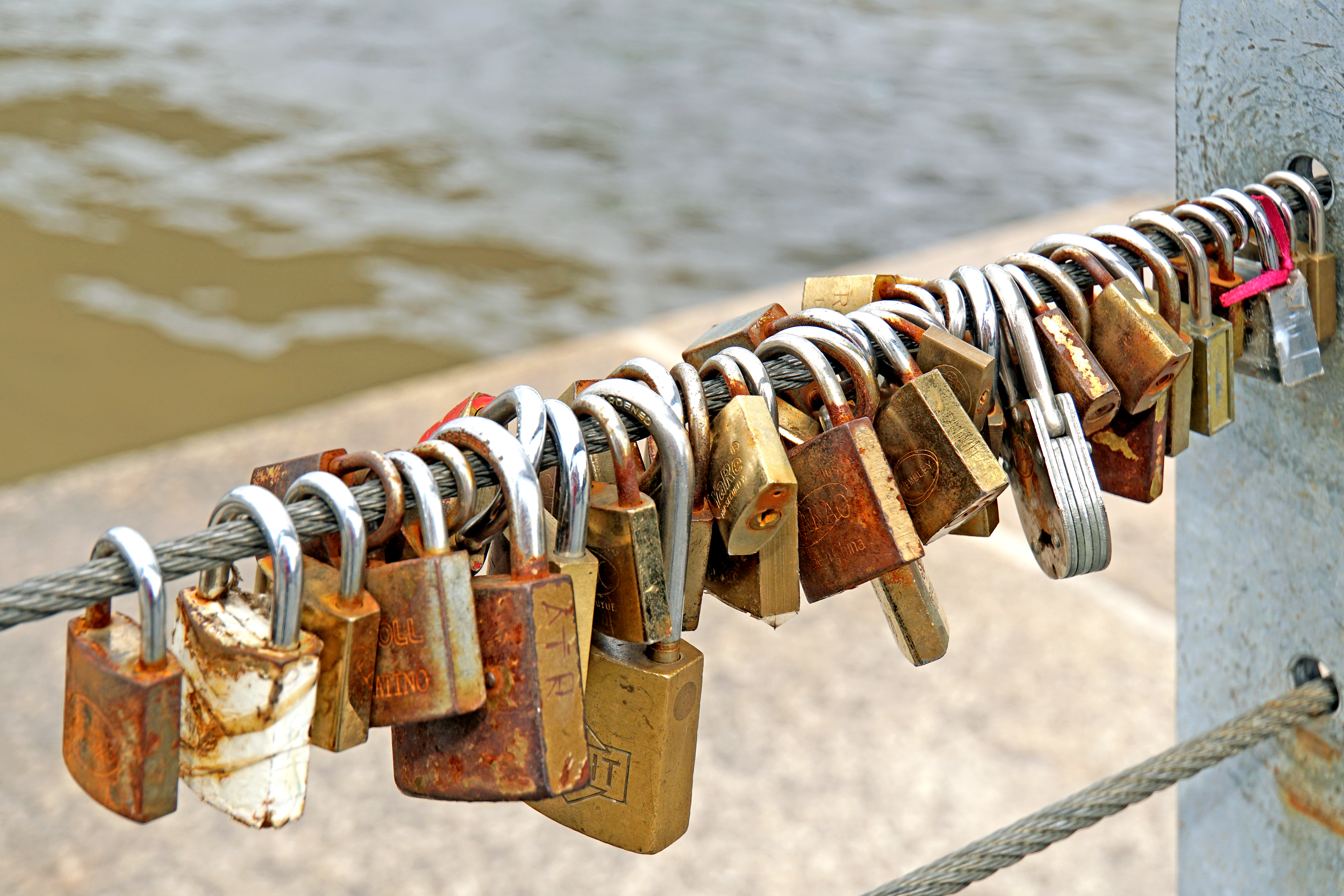
Love locks beside the Puente de la Mujer.

The work was conceived by businessman Alberto L. González, who donated money for its construction. Costing about US$6 million, the bridge was manufactured by the Urssa steel fabrication conglomerate in the city of Vitoria-Gasteiz in the Basque Country of northern Spain.

The Puente de la Mujer or "Woman's Bridge" in Buenos Aires (2024).

According to business executive Bob Schmetterer, the bridge was not part of the original Puerto Madero project. Jorge Heymann, a Buenos Aires advertising executive, had been hired to develop an advertising campaign for Puerto Madero, but his analysis showed that the biggest challenge of the site was access, not public awareness. A landmark footbridge, Heymann suggested, while certainly more costly than an initial advertising campaign would have been, would be more practical and lasting. The developer agreed with the assessment, and he built the structure.

Construction of the Puente de la Mujer started in 1998, with the opening taking place on 20 December 2001. The bridge was declared a Cultural Heritage of the City of Buenos Aires in 2018.

In 2022, the floor of the bridge was renovated for the first time, using plastic wood made with bottles donated in the green points of the city.

== See also ==
- Sundial Bridge, Redding, United States
- Puente de la Unidad, Monterrey, Mexico
- Samuel Beckett Bridge, Dublin, Ireland
- Alamillo Bridge, Seville, Spain
- Chords Bridge, Jerusalem, Israel
