= Puente de la Unidad =

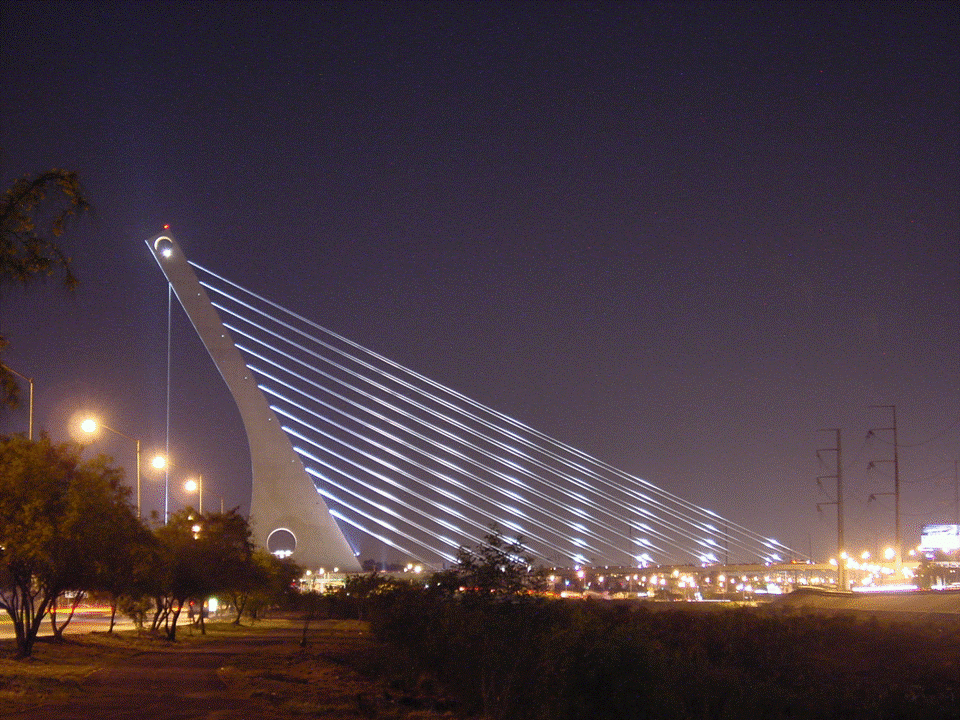
- Puente de la Unidad at night
- Coordinates: 25°40′05″N 100°22′49″W
- Carries: vehicles
- Crosses: Santa Catarina River
- Locale: Monterrey, Nuevo León, Mexico

Characteristics
- Design: Cable-stayed bridge, inclined pylon, asymmetric, semi-fan arrangement
- Material: Concrete (pylon)
- Total length: 304 metres (997 ft)
- Width: 28 to 35 metres (92 to 115 ft)
- Height: 160 metres (520 ft) (pylon)
- Longest span: 185 metres (607 ft)

History
- Designer: Daniel Tassin
- Constructed by: Grupo Garza Ponce

Puente de la Unidad or Viaducto de la Unidad is a cantilever spar cable-stayed bridge designed by Óscar Bulnes that crosses the Santa Catarina River and connects the cities of Monterrey and San Pedro Garza García in the Mexican state of Nuevo León. It is part of a circuit called "Circuito La Unidad", which would consist of the interconnection of a series of avenues.

== History ==
The bridge was finished in 2003 and has been controversial even before its completion because the river it crosses is dry almost all year long.

Although a huge part of the cost of this bridge was done by the business class of Monterrey, they were aware that the Santa Catarina River is affected by overflowing water from saturated rain caused by hurricanes. The San Pedro neighborhood is very well connected to the Colinas San Jerónimo and Cumbres vicinity using this bridge.

Last 2010, Hurricane Alex burst millions of metric tons of water. The water carried garbage on its path, damaging almost every structure of the previously dry river.

This method of construction respects the natural pathway of the dry river at demanding intervals.

== See also ==
- Puente de la Mujer, Buenos Aires, Argentina
- Samuel Beckett Bridge, Dublin, Ireland
- Sundial Bridge at Turtle Bay, California, United States
- Puente del Alamillo, Seville, Spain
- Assut de l'Or Bridge, Valencia, Spain
- Margaret Hunt Hill Bridge, Dallas, Texas, United States
