= Sundial Bridge at Turtle Bay =

Bridge designed by Santiago Calatrava in Redding, California, USA

Sundial Bridge
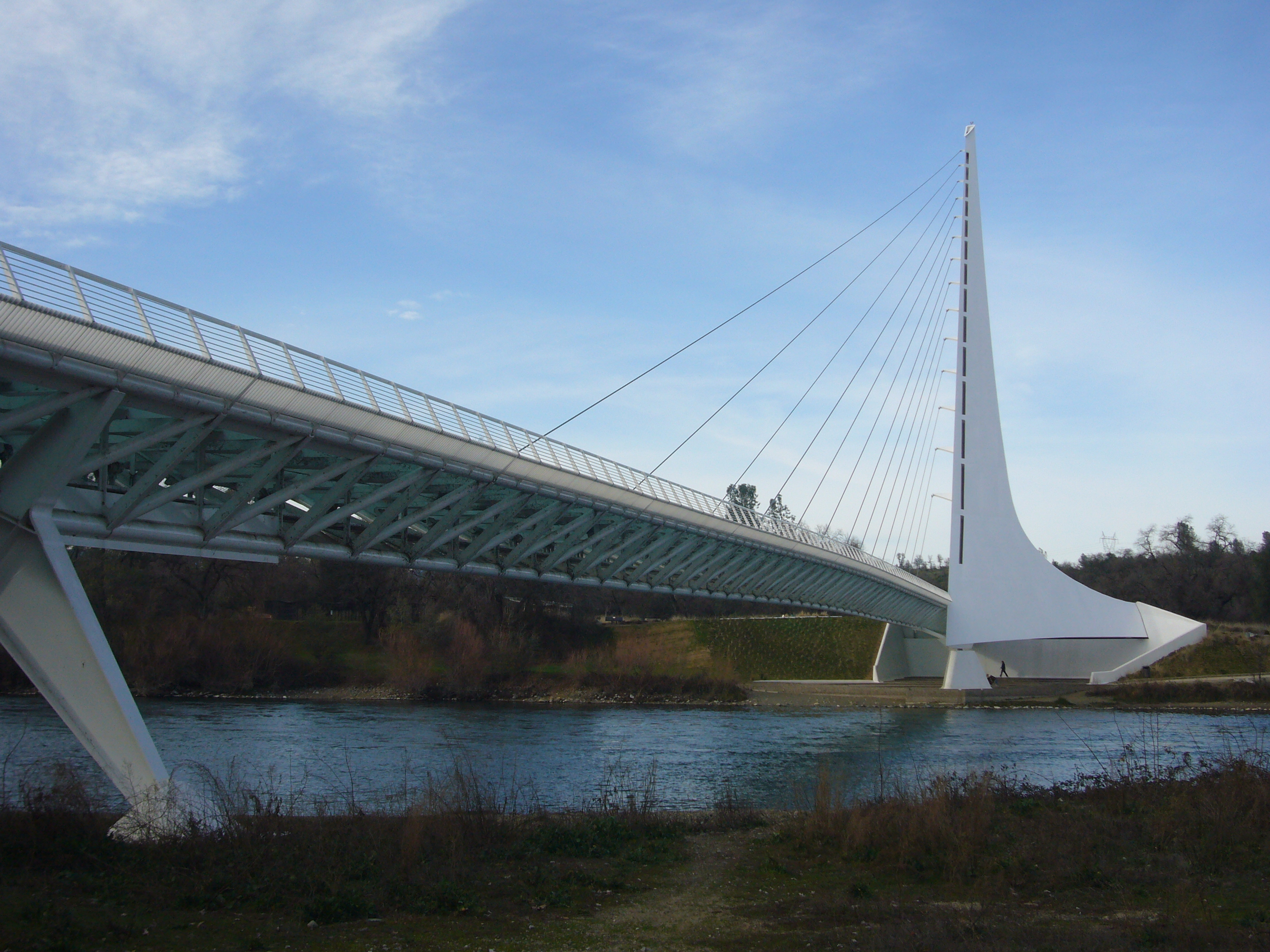
- Coordinates: 40°35′32″N 122°22′39″W
- Carries: Bicycles and pedestrians
- Crosses: Sacramento River
- Locale: Redding, California
- Official name: Sundial Bridge

Characteristics
- Design: Cantilever spar cable-stayed bridge
- Total length: 700 feet (210 m)
- Width: 23 feet (7.0 m)
- Clearance below: 26 feet (7.9 m)

History
- Designer: Santiago Calatrava
- Opened: July 4, 2004

Location
- Interactive map of Sundial Bridge

The Sundial Bridge (also known as the Sundial Bridge at Turtle Bay) is a cantilever spar cable-stayed bridge for bicycles and pedestrians that spans the Sacramento River in Redding, California, United States and forms a large sundial. It was designed by Santiago Calatrava and completed in 2004 at a cost of US$23.5 million. The bridge has become iconic for Redding.

== Description ==
The Sundial Bridge provides pedestrian access to the north and south areas of Turtle Bay Exploration Park, a complex containing environmental, art and history museums and the McConnell Arboretum and Gardens. It also forms the gateway to the Sacramento River Trail, a 35-mile-long (56 km) trail completed in 2010 that extends along both sides of the river and connects the bridge to the Shasta Dam. Drift boats of fishermen are often seen passing beneath the bridge as they fish for steelhead and rainbow trout. In the distance, Mount Shasta is barely visible. Shasta Bally is visible to the West looking upstream the Sacramento.

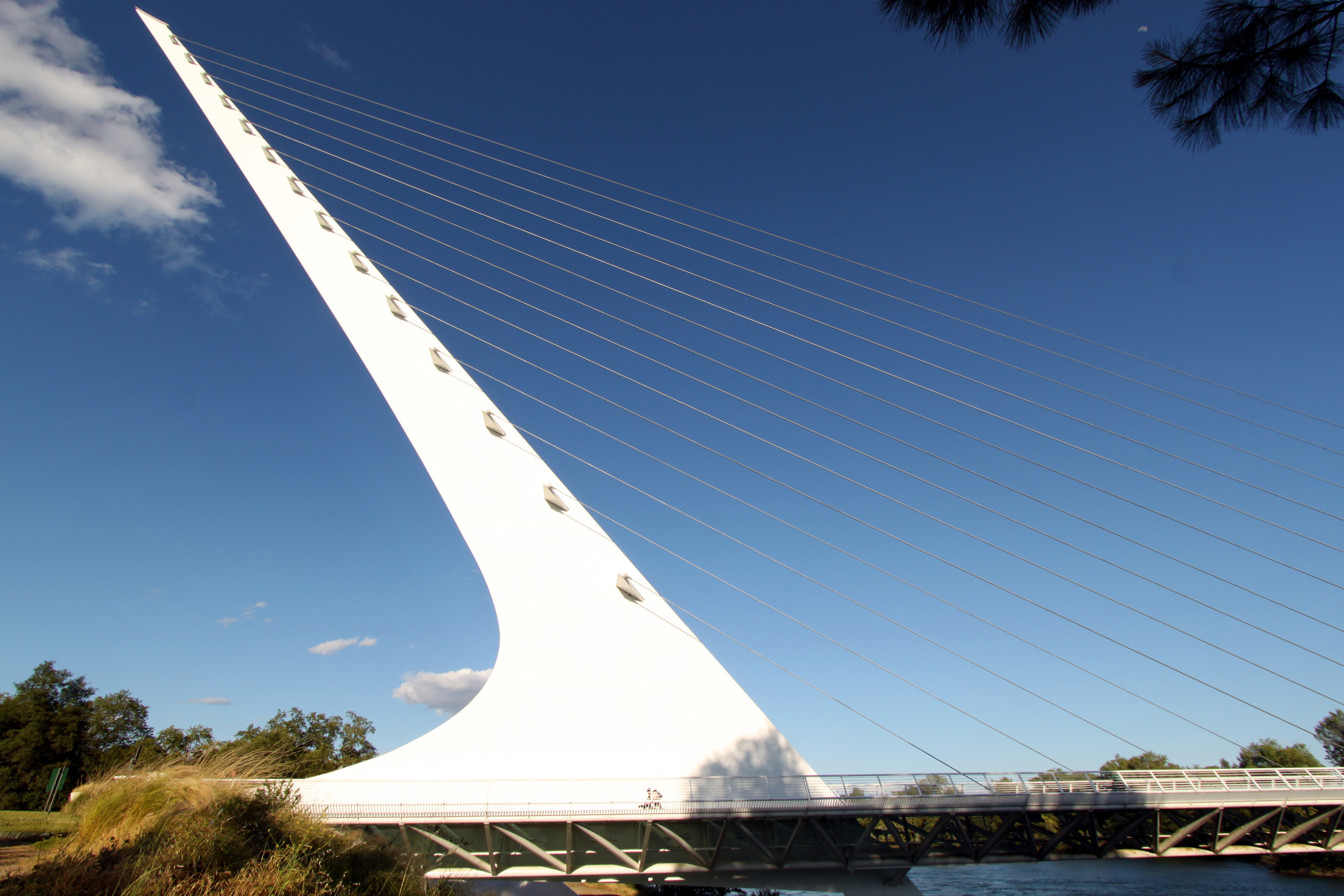
Support tower of Sundial Bridge

== Sundial ==
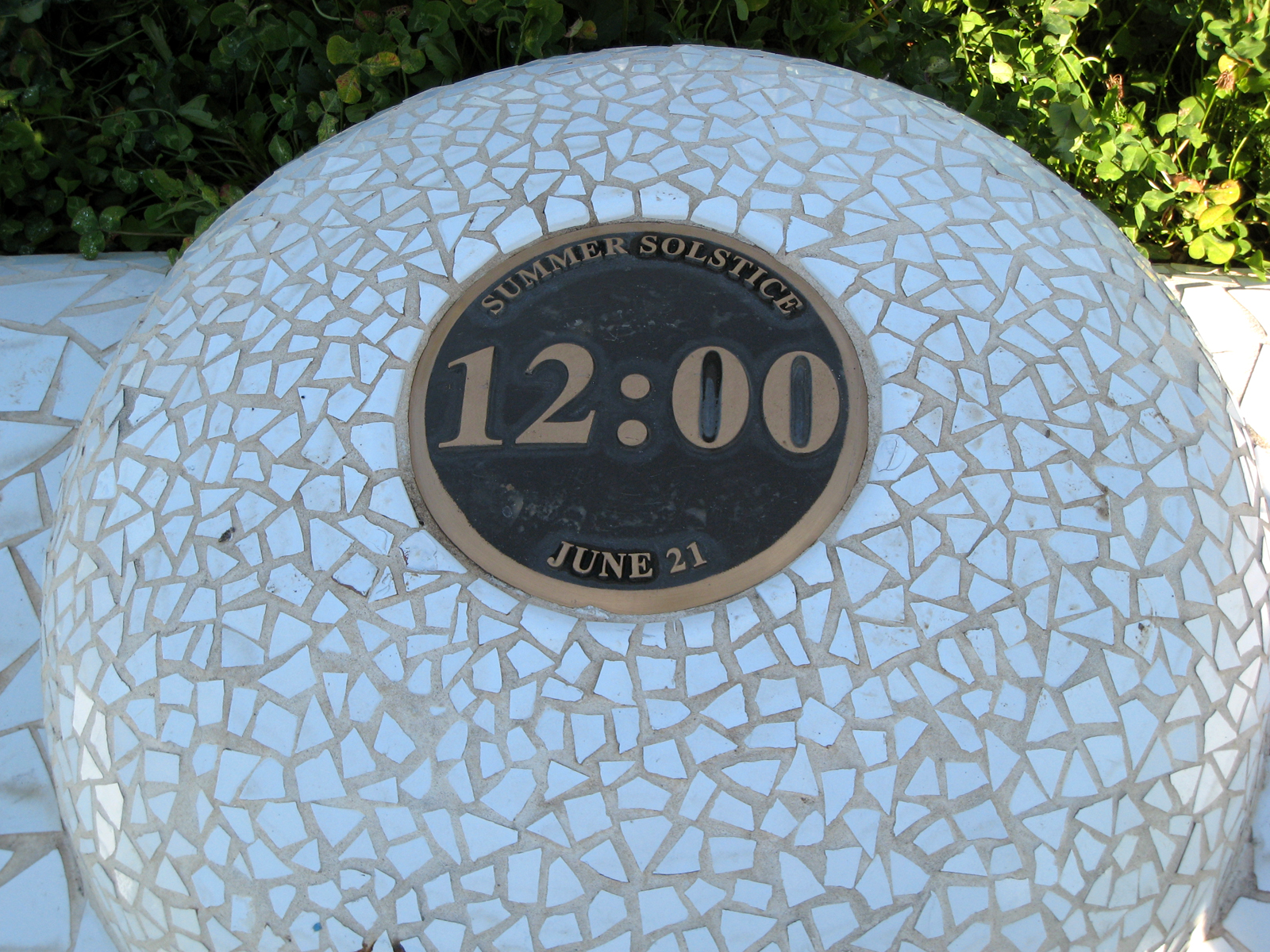
One of the markers on the dial of the sundial.

The support tower of the bridge forms a single 217-foot (66 m) mast that points due north at a cantilevered angle (42 degrees), allowing it to serve as the gnomon of a sundial. The spar's angle is slightly incorrect for it to be accurate the whole year, as the bridge's latitude is approximately 40.59 degrees. It has been billed as the world's largest sundial, although Taipei 101 and the associated sundial design of its adjoining park are much larger. The Sundial Bridge gnomon's shadow is cast upon a large dial to the north of the bridge. The shadow cast by the tower is said by the nearby time markings (see photo) to be exactly accurate on only one day in a year – the summer solstice, June 20 or 21 – but that has not been demonstrated. The time is given as Pacific Daylight Time. The tip of the shadow moves at approximately one foot per minute so that the Earth's rotation about its axis can be seen with the naked eye.

== Design ==
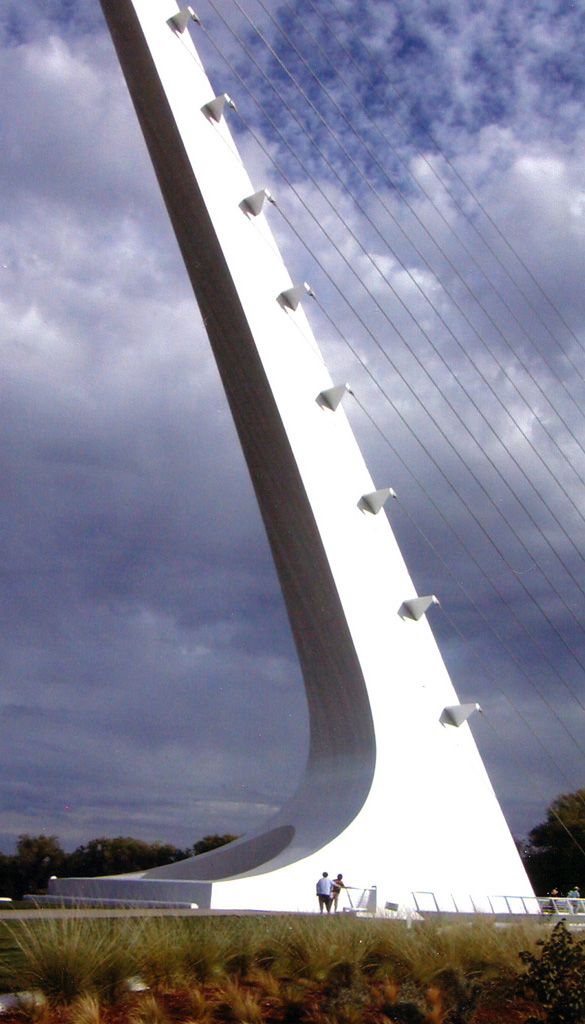
The support tower of the bridge.

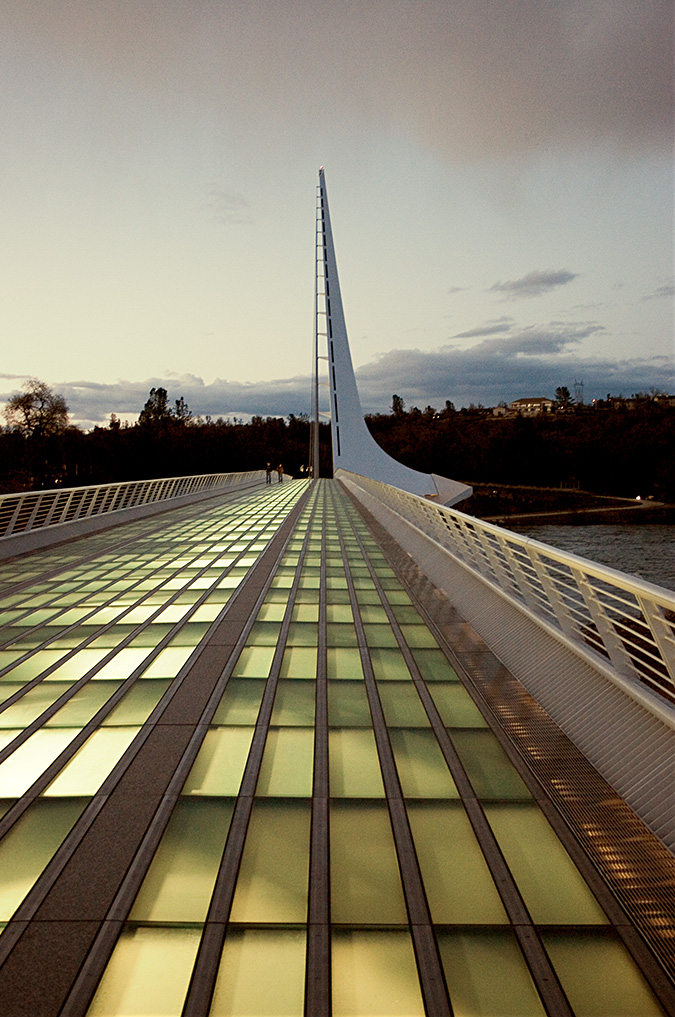
The translucent glass pavement of the bridge

The Sundial Bridge is a cantilever spar cable-stayed bridge, similar to Calatrava's earlier design of the Puente del Alamillo in Seville, Spain (1992). This type of bridge does not balance the forces by using a symmetrical arrangement of cable forces on each side of its support tower; instead, it uses a cantilever tower, set at a 42-degree angle and loaded by cable stays on only one side. This design requires that the spar resist bending and torsional forces and that its foundation resists overturning. While this leads to a less structurally efficient structure, the architectural statement is dramatic. The bridge is 700 feet (210 m) in length and crosses the river without touching the water, a design criterion that helps protect the salmon spawning grounds beneath the bridge. The cable stays are not centered on the walkway but instead divide the bridge into a major and minor path.

The cable for the bridge totals 4,342 feet (1,323 m) and was made in England. The dial of the sundial and a small plaza beneath the support tower are decorated with broken white tile from Spain. The bridge's deck is surfaced with translucent structural glass from Quebec, which is illuminated from beneath and glows aquamarine at night. The steel support structure of the bridge was made in Vancouver, Washington and transported in 40-foot (12 m) sections by truck to Redding.

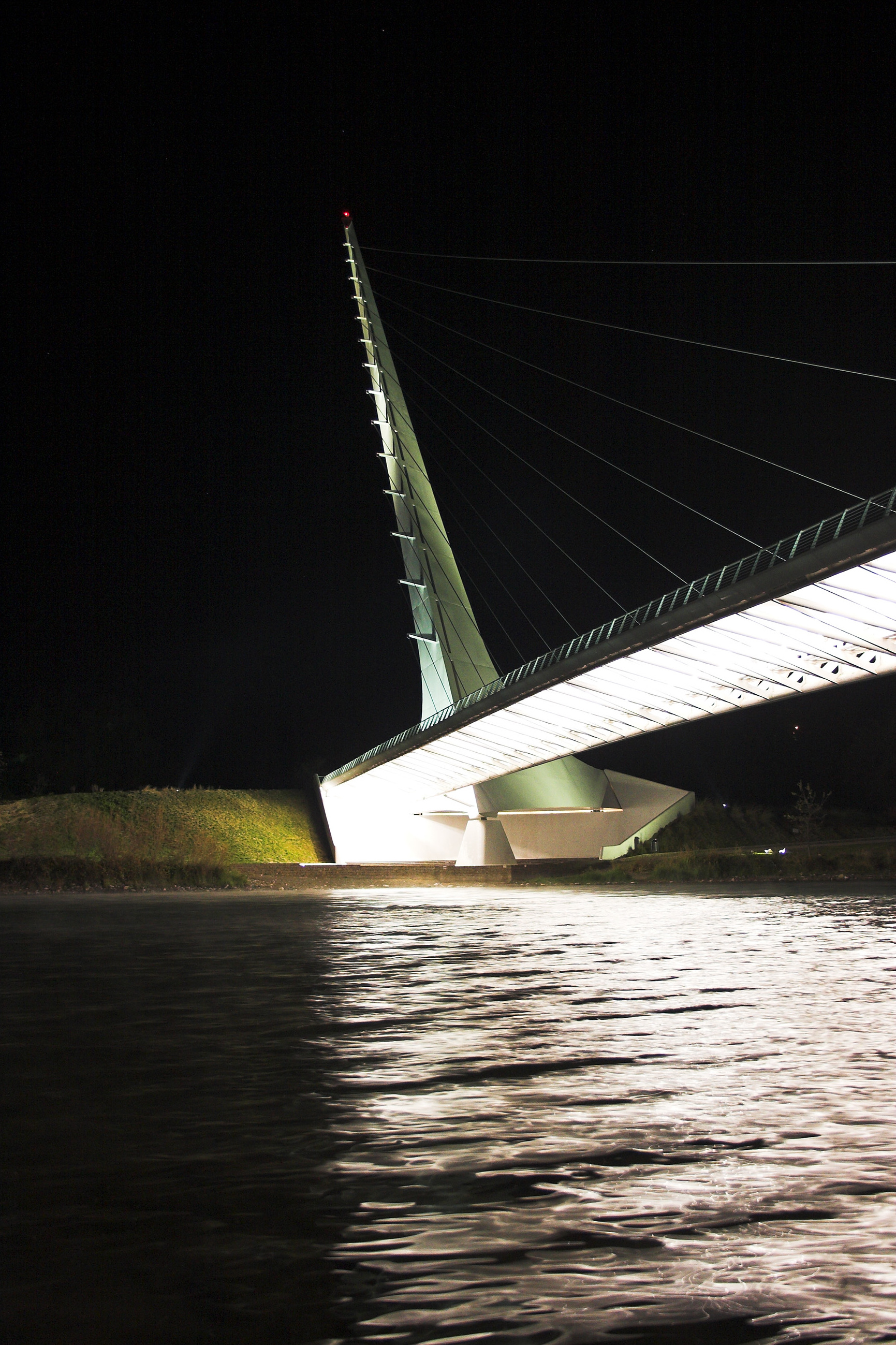
Sundial Bridge at night

== History ==
Plans for the Sundial Bridge began in the 1990s, when the city of Redding budgeted $3 million for a pedestrian bridge across the river. However, costs escalated after Calatrava's design was chosen in 1996, and the project supported by a small group of doctors, lawyers, and other professionals and opposed by other residents who thought it would be too expensive and who favored a more "folksy" covered bridge design. The bridge was completed in 2004, three years later than originally planned, at a cost of $23.5 million, with funding from the Redding-based McConnell Foundation. The expense was justified on the basis that it would increase tourism in the Redding area, which also features Shasta Dam as another architectural marvel, and it has been successful in that goal.

== Tourism ==
In the fiscal year following its grand opening, Turtle Bay Exploration Park, adjacent to the bridge, saw a 42-percent increase in its visitation. As of 2011, Redding's city manager stated that the bridge "continues to generate millions of dollars worth of commerce and tourism each year".

== Events ==
In 2009, Nor-Cal Think Pink, a non-profit organization dedicated to raising awareness of the importance of early detection of breast cancer, received approval from the City of Redding to illuminate the Sundial Bridge in pink for its Think Pink Day. The event now takes place annually.

== In popular culture ==
The bridge is the cover image of a general physics textbook by Serway and Jewett, demonstrating the bridge resisting forces of wind and gravity.

== See also ==
- Puente de la Mujer, Buenos Aires, Argentina
- Samuel Beckett Bridge, Dublin, Ireland
- Puente de la Unidad, Monterrey, Mexico
- Alamillo Bridge, Seville, Spain
