= Assut de l'Or Bridge =

Assut de l'Or Bridge Pont de l'Assut de l'Or (Valencian) Puente de l'Assut de l'Or (Spanish)
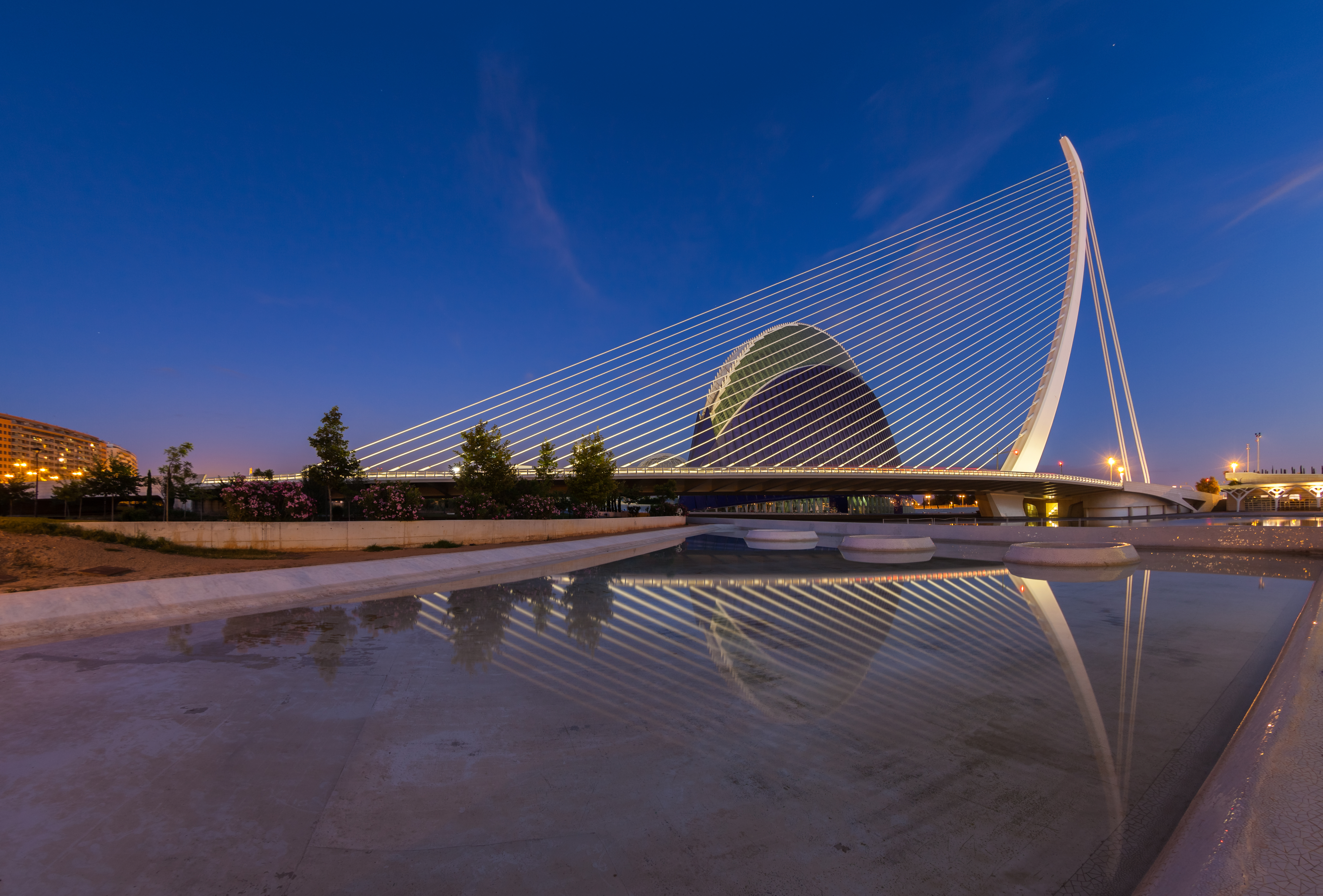
- Side view of the Assut de l'Or Bridge with L'Agora in the background
- Coordinates: 39°27′17.3″N 00°20′58.7″W
- Carries: six vehicular traffic lanes, two tram lanes, and two pedestrian cycling lanes
- Crosses: Túria Gardens (former riverbed of Túria River)
- Locale: Valencia, Spain

Characteristics
- Design: cable-stayed bridge with a backward curved pylon
- Total length: 180 metres
- Height: 125 metres (making it the highest point of the city)
- No. of spans: one with 29 cable stays

History
- Architect: Santiago Calatrava
- Construction cost: 59.9 million Euros
- Inaugurated: 12/12/2008

The Assut de l'Or Bridge (Valencian: Pont de l'Assut de l'Or, Spanish: Puente de l'Assut de l'Or) (Note: Pronunciation, Valencian: [ˈpɔnd de laˈsud ˈdɔɾ], Spanish: [ˈpwente ðe laˈsuð ˈðoɾ].) is a white single-pylon cable-stayed bridge in the City of Arts and Sciences in Valencia, Spain, designed by Valencian architect and civil engineer Santiago Calatrava and completed in December 2008. The name l'Assut de l'Or is Valencian for the Dam of the Gold and refers to a dam that was located nearby. (Note: Locally it is referred to as El Perniler (The Ham Holder) or Pont de l'Arpa (The Harp Bridge) in Valencian. Spanish: El Jamonero (The Ham Holder) or Puente del Arpa (The Harp Bridge).) Calatrava called it the Serreria Bridge.

== Design ==
The bridge crosses the Túria Gardens in southeast Valencia, Spain near the east end of the City of Arts and Sciences complex. Its design is a variant of Santiago Calatrava's 1992 design of a cantilever spar cable-stayed bridge in Seville, Spain. In the Serreria bridge, the pylon is curved backward and back-stayed to concrete counterweights in the roadway. The aesthetic effect of the Serreria bridge arises in part from the curved pylon and the 29 parallel cables supporting the bridge deck, accented at night by spotlighting of the cables and the pylon. The bridge deck has two carriageways, three lanes each for cars and one additional lane for a tramway, and a carriageway for only pedestrian and cycle traffic along the middle spine of the deck by the cable stays.

== Gallery ==
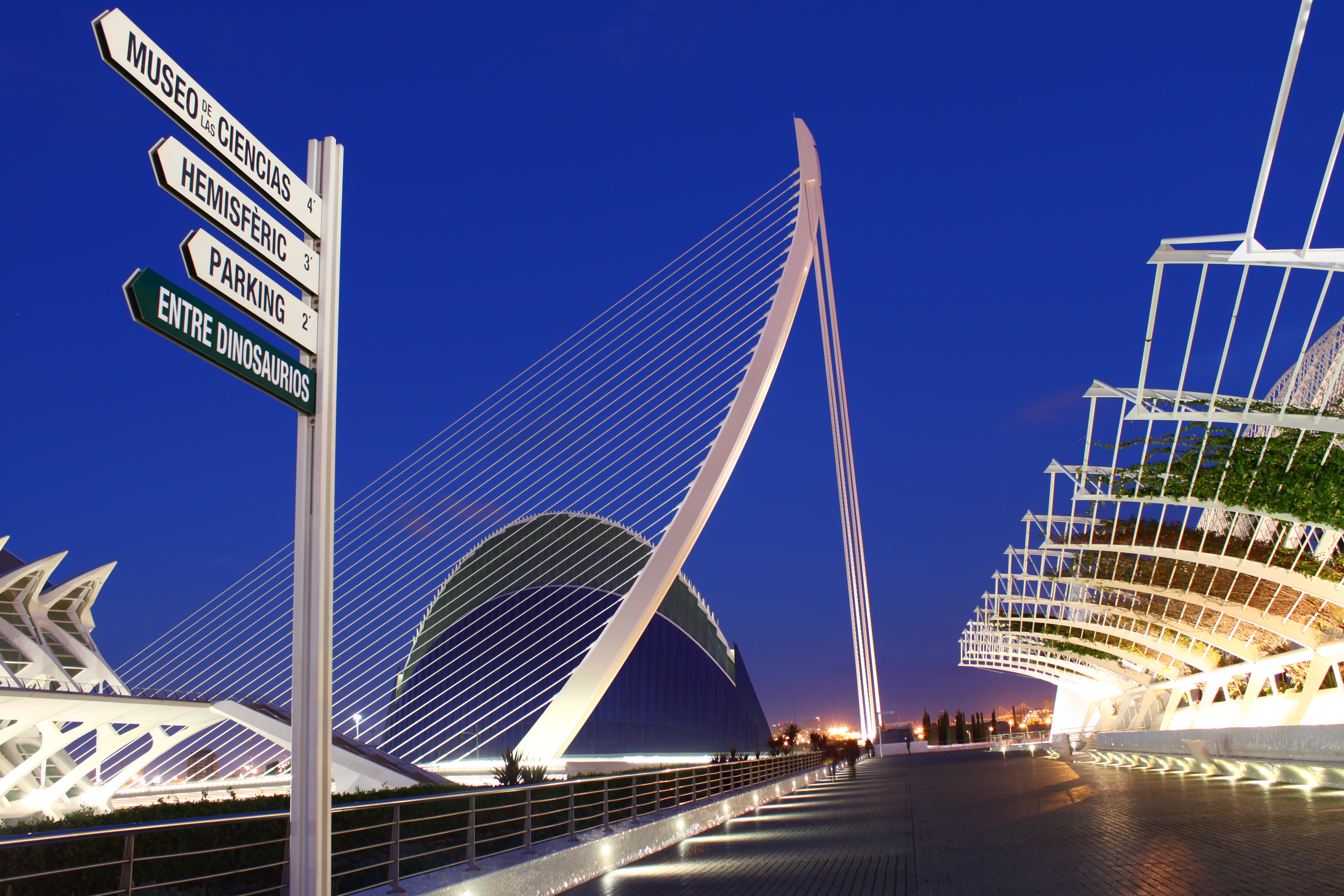
Assut de l'Or Bridge at night

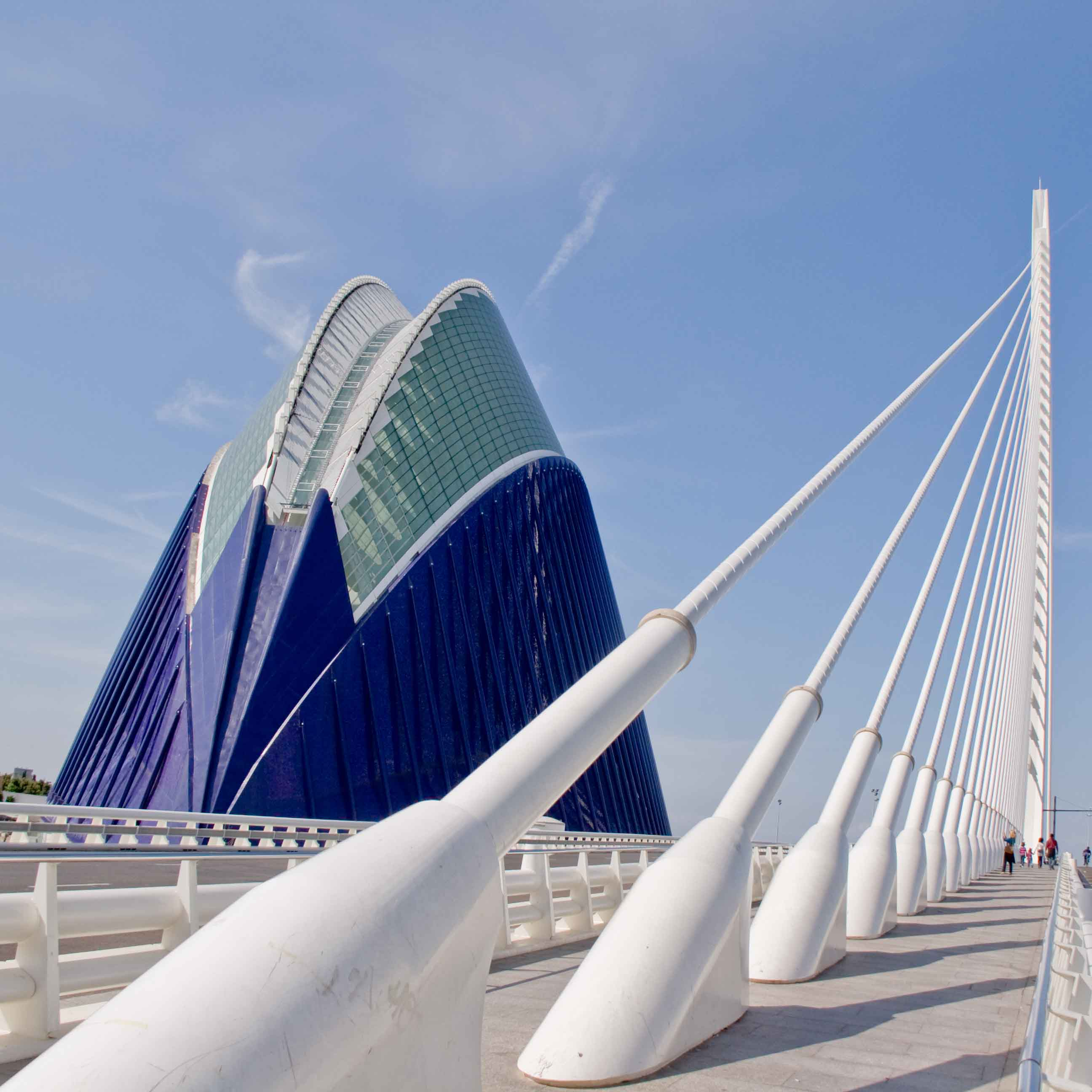
Front cable stays

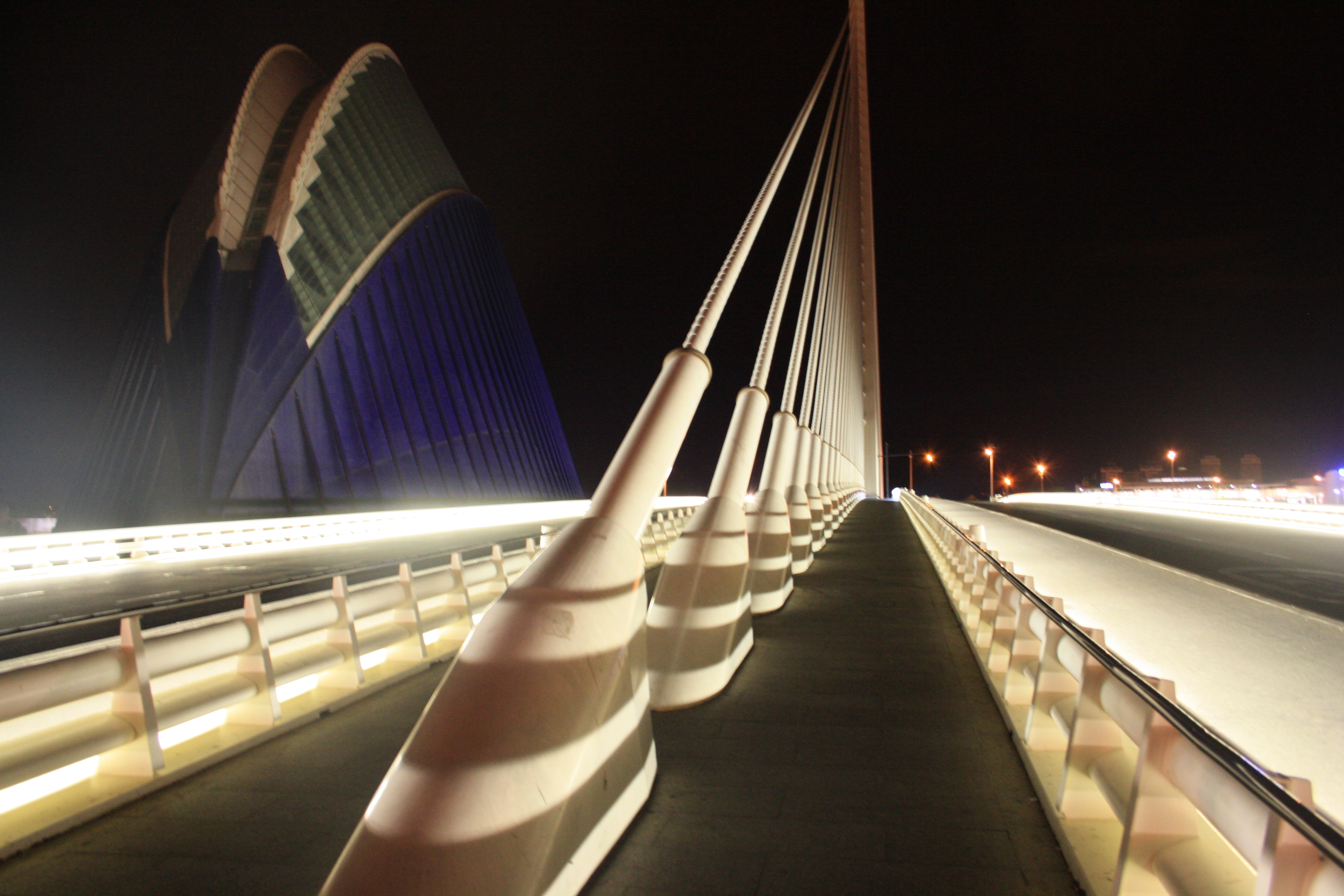
Front cable stays at night

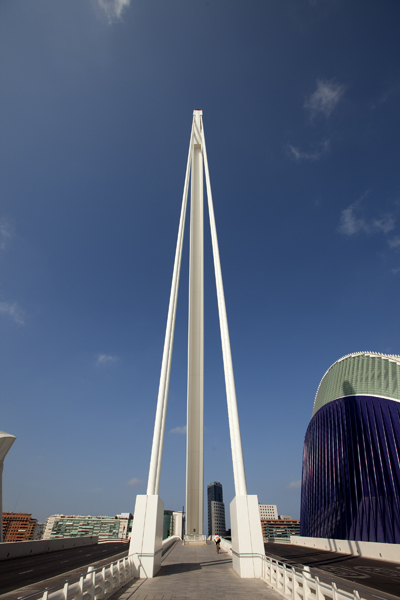
Backstays

== See also ==
- Samuel Beckett Bridge in Dublin, Ireland, in which the forward curved pylon is also back-stayed
- The Erasmusbrug in the Netherlands, another single pylon cable-stayed bridge in which the pylon is back-stayed
- Montolivet Bridge - another bridge in the City of Arts and Sciences designed by Santiago Calatrava
