= Gammon India =

Indian construction company

Gammon India Limited
- Company type: Public
- Traded as: NSE: GAMMONIND; BSE: 509550
- Industry: Engineering, procurement and construction
- Founded: 15 June 1922; 104 years ago
- Founder: John C. Gammon
- Headquarters: Mumbai, India
- Area served: Worldwide
- Key people: Abhijit Rajan (Chairman); Ajit Desai (CEO); Anurag Choudhry (CFO); Niki Shingade (Company Secretary)
- Revenue: ₹52.84 crore (US$5.5 million) (2021)
- Net income: ₹−716.85 crore (US$−75 million) (2021)
- Number of employees: 50 (March 2019)
- Website: www.gammonindia.com

Gammon India Limited is one of the largest civil engineering construction companies in India. Headquartered in Mumbai, it was founded in 1922 by John C. Gammon.

== Notable projects ==
Gammon India has executed some notable civil engineering projects:

- First Project
  - The first precast reinforced concrete piling job in India—construction of the foundations of the Gateway of India, Mumbai in 1919
- Bridge Project
  - Cable-stayed bridge at Akkar, Sikkim
  - Gammon have built the largest number of bridges in the Commonwealth region.
- Tunnel Project
  - One of the longest railway tunnel in Asia for Konkan Railway at Ratnagiri, Maharashtra
  - Mahatma Gandhi Setu spanning the river Ganges, between Patna and Hajipur in Bihar
- Building Project
  - Terminal building for Sharjah International Airport, UAE
- Metro Project
  - Elevated viaducts for Delhi Metro Rail Corporation
- Nuclear Project
  - India's first second-generation nuclear reactor Prototype Fast Breeder Reactor at Kalpakkam
- Thermal power Project
  - The first 500 MW thermal power station at Trombay
- Flyover Project
  - The then longest urban flyover at Hebbal for the Bangalore Development Authority - 5.3km
- Cooling Tower Project
  - The tallest cooling tower at Bhusawal

Gammon India was the recipient of a performance bonus based on its delivery of the extradosed flyover ahead of the 2010 Commonwealth Games at Delhi for the Delhi Metro Rail Corporation (DMRC). Gammon India was also awarded the Signature Bridge Project award for executing a modern designed bridge and approach way for the Delhi Tourism and Transportation Development Corporation (DTTDC). This project, valued at close to Rs.10,000 million, is designed to ease traffic flow in Wazirabad, a high traffic density zone in North Delhi.

== Notable accidents ==
- In 2007, a portion of a flyover being built by Gammon India in Panjagutta area in Hyderabad collapsed, killing 20 people.
- In 2009, a bridge being built by Gammon India for Metro rail in Delhi collapsed, killing 6 people and injuring 13.
