= Signature Bridge =

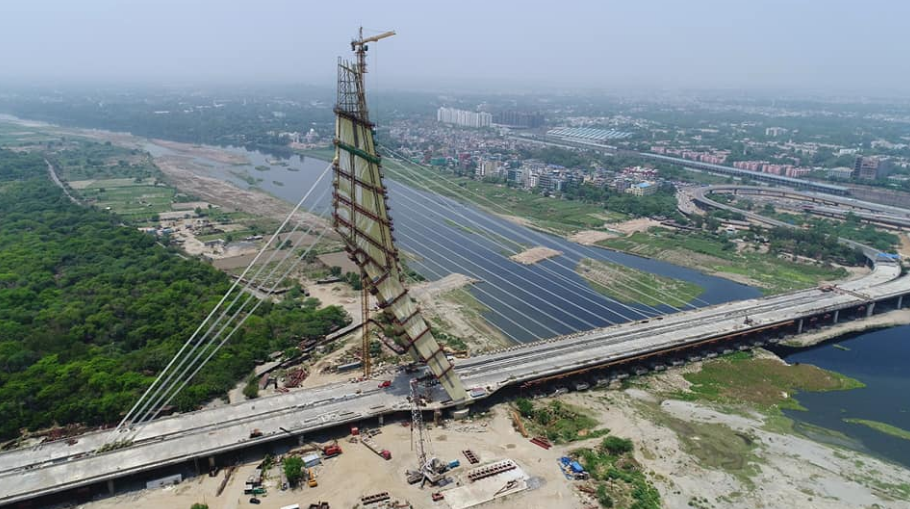
- The Signature Bridge during construction phase
- Coordinates: 28.7053°N 77.2340°E
- Crosses: River Yamuna
- Locale: Delhi, India
- Official name: Signature Bridge
- Maintained by: Delhi Tourism and Transportation Development Corporation (DTTDC)

Characteristics
- Design: Cantilever spar cable-stayed bridge
- Material: Steel and Concrete
- Total length: 675 metres (2,215 ft)
- Width: 35.2 metres (115 ft)
- Height: 165 metres (541 ft)
- Longest span: 251 metres (823 ft)

History
- Architect: Ratan J. Batliboi - Architects Pvt Ltd, Mumbai
- Engineering design by: Schlaich Bergermann Partner, Tensa India, Construma Consultancy (Structural Design); Wacker Neuson (Wind Tunnel Study); IIT Roorkee (Seismic Design)
- Constructed by: Gammon India, Tensa India and Construtora Cidade
- Construction start: 2010
- Opened: 4 November 2018

Location
- Interactive map of Signature Bridge

The Signature Bridge is a cantilever spar cable-stayed bridge which spans the Yamuna river at Shourya section, connecting Wazirabad to East Delhi. It is India's first asymmetrical cable-stayed bridge. The pylon of the Signature bridge is the tallest structure in Delhi and is double the height of Qutub Minar with its 154-metre high viewing box, which is a location where visitors take selfies. It shortens the travel time between north and northeast Delhi.

== Background and History ==
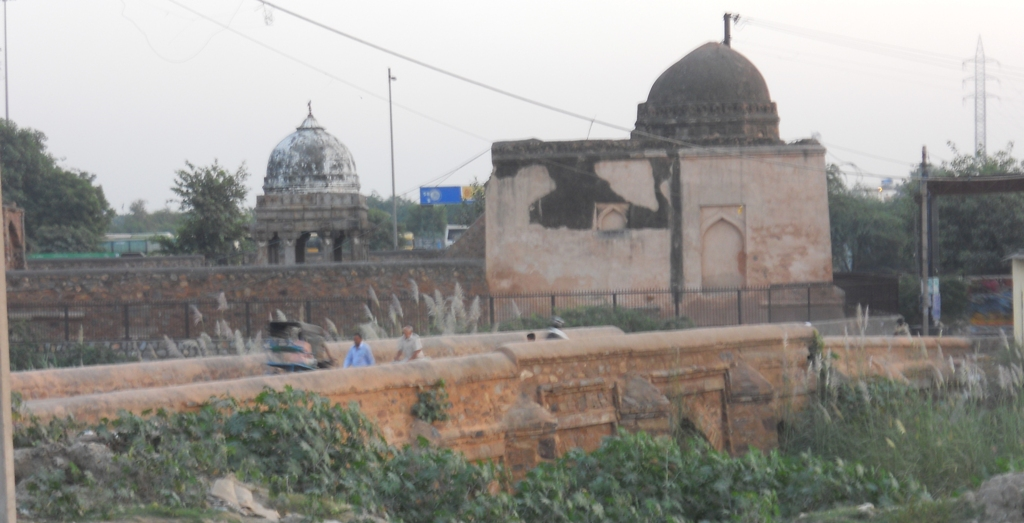
The old Wazirabad bridge

In 1997, 28 school students died in an accident on the narrow Wazirabad bridge when their bus plunged into the river. Since then, the Delhi government had plans to build another parallel wide bridge nearby to alleviate traffic congestion. By the end of 1998, the Delhi government finalised the draft plan for this bridge. However, construction of the bridge was delayed due to multiple reasons, mainly lack of manpower and financial difficulties. When the project started, its final cost was Rs. 1518.37 crore The Delhi government was financially restricted and it was very difficult for it to fund the extra rising budget. Work finally started in 2010. A fresh deadline of end 2016 was set in 2013. The bridge was finally inaugurated on 4 November 2018 by the then Chief Minister of Delhi Arvind Kejriwal after a number of delays.

== Details ==
The bridge is a Cantilever spar cable-stayed bridge, a type of Cable-stayed bridge in which cables are in a combination of radial and semi-harp arrangement; cables are spaced apart on the pylon, like the harp design, but connected to one point or a number of closely spaced points on the deck. The dynamically shaped pylon consists of 2 inclined columns, which are rigidly connected to the driving lanes and bend mid-way. The upper portion of the pylon anchors the back-stay cables as well as the main-span cables and the self-weight of the pylon balances out the self-weight of the superstructure through the eccentric location of its center of gravity with respect to the pivot point of the pylon footing, reducing the load on back-stay cables which are fewer in number converged from the main-span cables. The bridge is 675 meters long and 35.2 meters wide. Built on the Yamuna river, this bridge connects east Delhi to Wazirabad. Tourists can be transported to the top of the main pillar, which is 154 m high, from where distant views of North Delhi can be seen.

- Structural Design Firm: Schlaich Bergermann Partner
- Contractor: Joint venture of Gammon India, Tensa India& Construtora Cidade
- Main span: 251 m
- Height of pylon: 165 m above ground
- Total length of infrastructure project: 6 km (approx.)
- Lanes: 2 x 4
- Deck surface: 25,000 m^{2}
- Total length of bridge: 675 m (incl. 100 m west extension)
- Side spans: 36 m
- Structural steel pylon: 5800 tonne
- Structural steel deck: 7400 tonne
- Open foundation: 6 nos.
- Closed foundation: 16 nos.
