= Samuel Beckett Bridge =

Bridge over the River Liffey in Ireland

Samuel Beckett Bridge Droichead Samuel Beckett
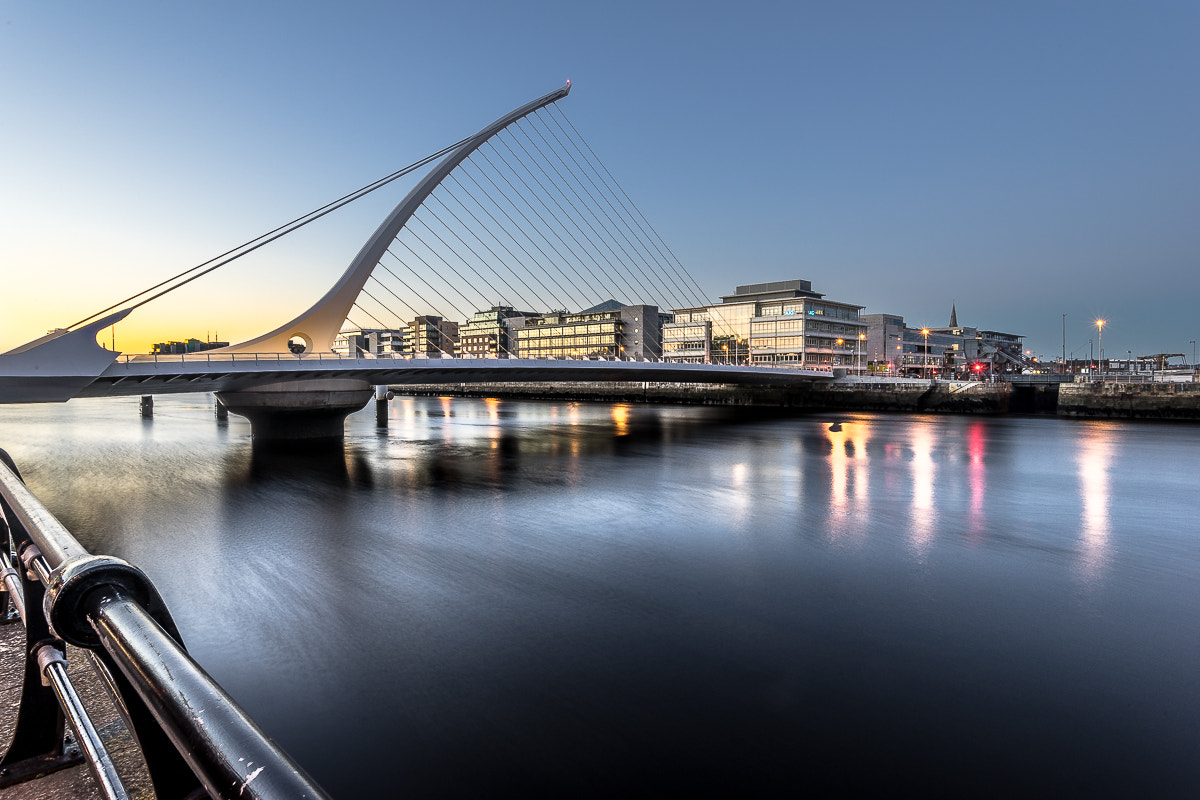
- Coordinates: 53.3470°N 6.2413°W
- Crosses: River Liffey
- Locale: Dublin, Ireland
- Named for: Samuel Beckett
- Preceded by: Seán O'Casey Bridge
- Followed by: East-Link

Characteristics
- Total length: 120 metres (390 ft)
- Height: 48 metres (157 ft)

History
- Designer: Santiago Calatrava
- Construction start: 2007
- Opened: 10 December 2009

Location
- Interactive map of Samuel Beckett Bridge

Samuel Beckett Bridge (Irish: Droichead Samuel Beckett) is a cable-stayed swingbridge in Dublin, Ireland that joins Sir John Rogerson's Quay on the south side of the River Liffey to Guild Street and North Wall Quay in the Docklands area.

== Design and construction ==
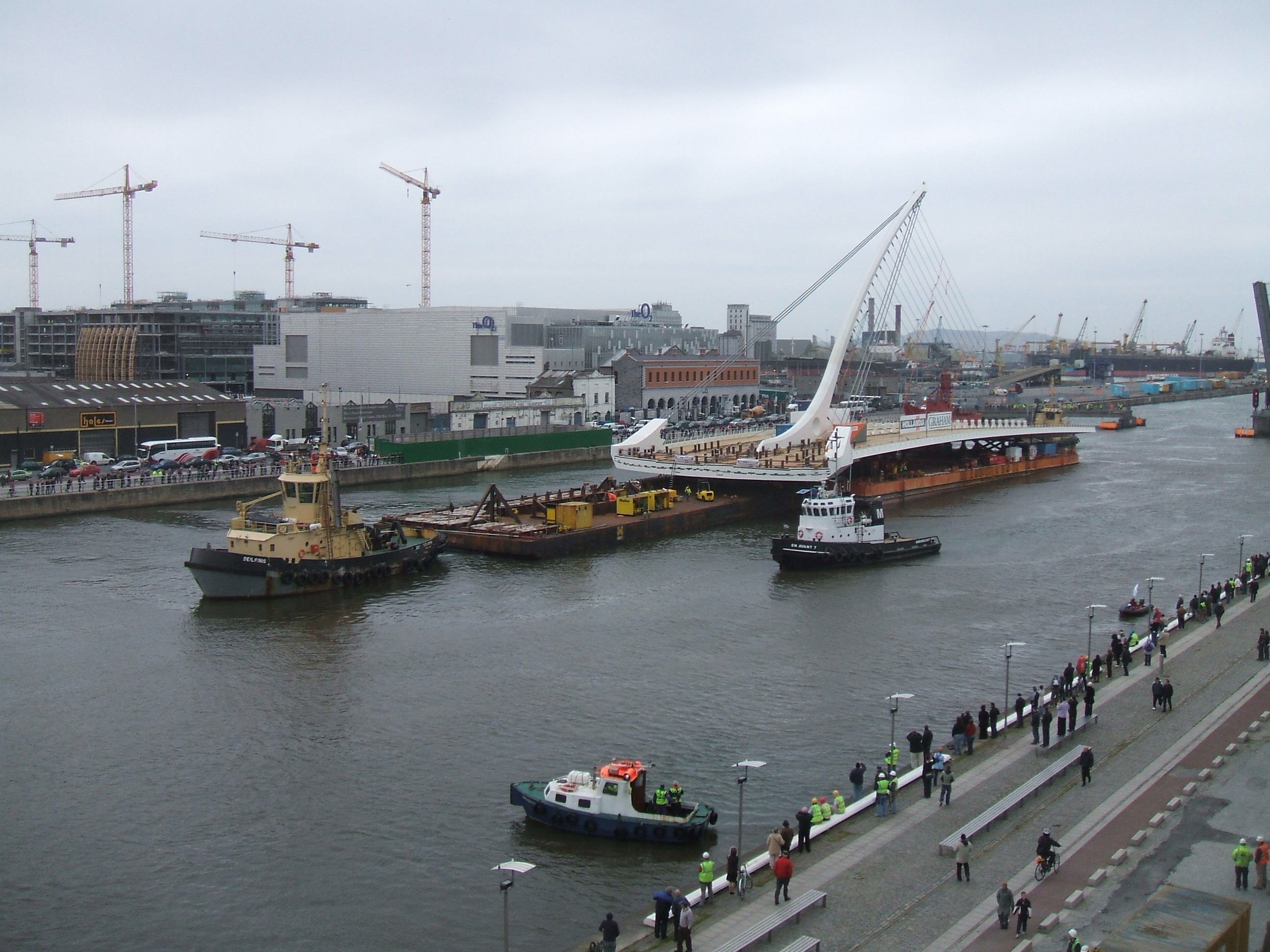
The main steel structure arriving by barge, May 2009

Architect Santiago Calatrava was the lead designer of the bridge. He was assisted with the civil and structural aspects of the design by Roughan & O'Donovan consulting engineers.

This was the second bridge in the area designed by Calatrava, the first being the James Joyce Bridge, which is further upriver.

Constructed by a "Graham Hollandia Joint Venture", the main span of the Samuel Beckett Bridge is supported by 31 cable stays from a doubly back-stayed single forward arc tubular tapered spar, with decking provided for four traffic and two pedestrian lanes. It is also capable of opening through an angle of 90 degrees allowing ships to pass through. This is achieved through a rotational mechanism housed in the base of the pylon.

The shape of the spar and its cables is said to evoke an image of a harp lying on its edge. (The harp being the national symbol for Ireland from as early as the thirteenth century).

The steel structure of the bridge was constructed in Rotterdam by Hollandia, a Dutch company also responsible for the steel fabrication of the London Eye. The steel span of the bridge was transferred from the Hollandia wharf in Krimpen aan den IJssel on 3 May 2009, with support from specialist transport company ALE Heavylift.

The bridge, which cost €60 million, is named for Irish writer Samuel Beckett (1906–1989). It was officially opened to pedestrians on 10 December 2009 by Dublin Lord Mayor, Emer Costello and to road traffic at 7 am the following day.

The bridge won Engineers Ireland's 'Engineering Project of the Year' in 2010.

== Criticism ==
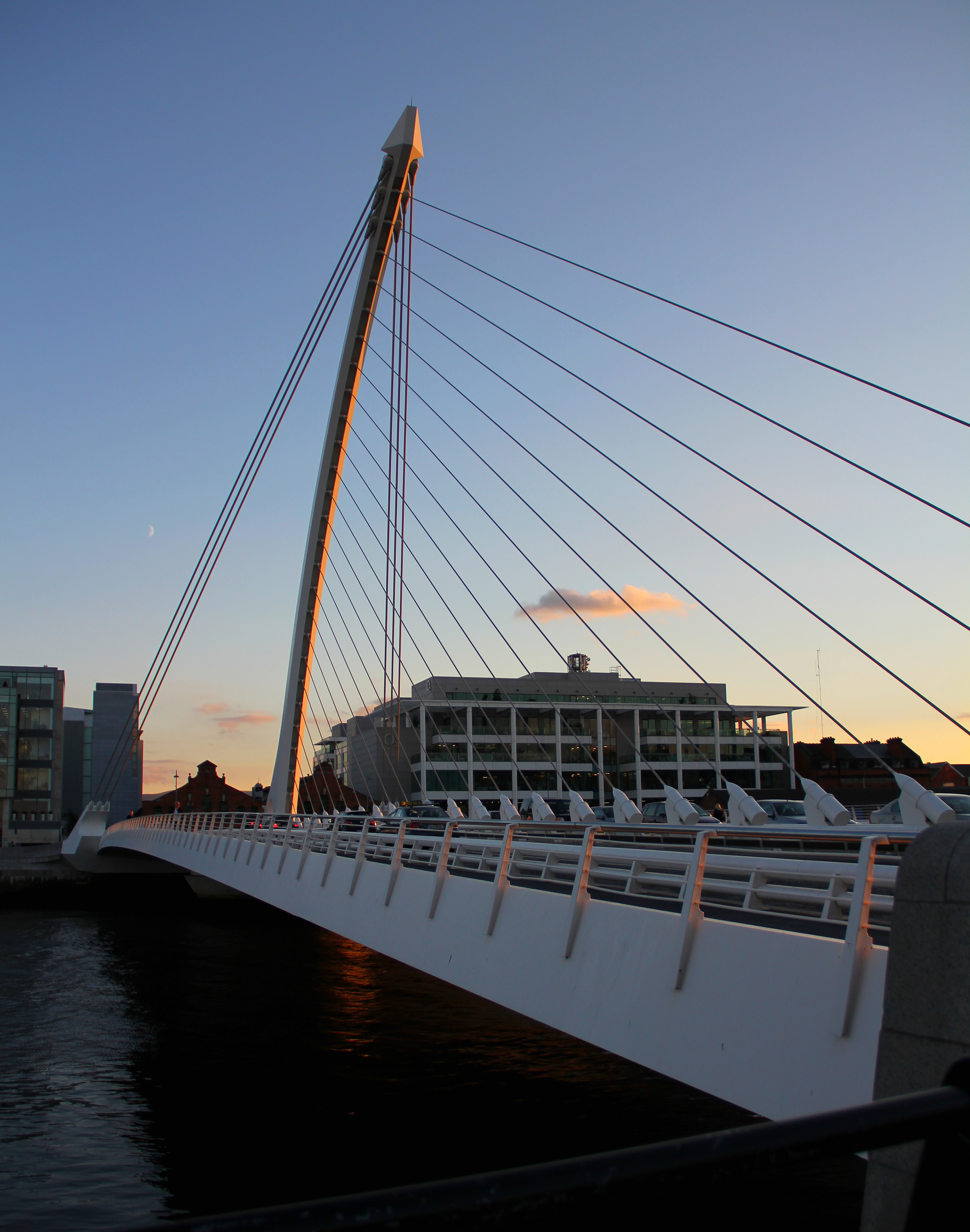
The forward curved pylon with 31 cable stays and two back stays

Commentators criticised traffic management restrictions in place around the bridge, saying that with certain turns onto the bridge being blocked, traffic would be diverted into the city centre undermining the bridge's purpose of reducing traffic on the downstream bridges. Unhappiness was also expressed over the fact that these restrictions would force drivers to use the East-Link Toll Bridge. Dublin City Council replied that these restrictions were mandated by An Bord Pleanála to prevent users of the East-Link bridge (outside the city) from coming into the city.

At the time of opening, there was also criticism that no bus services had plans to use the bridge.

== See also ==
- Puente de la Mujer, Buenos Aires, Argentina
- Sundial Bridge at Turtle Bay, California, United States
- Puente de la Unidad, Monterrey, Mexico
- Puente del Alamillo, Seville, Spain
- Assut de l'Or Bridge, Valencia, Spain
