= Chords Bridge =

Bridge in Jerusalem

Chords Bridge גשר המיתרים
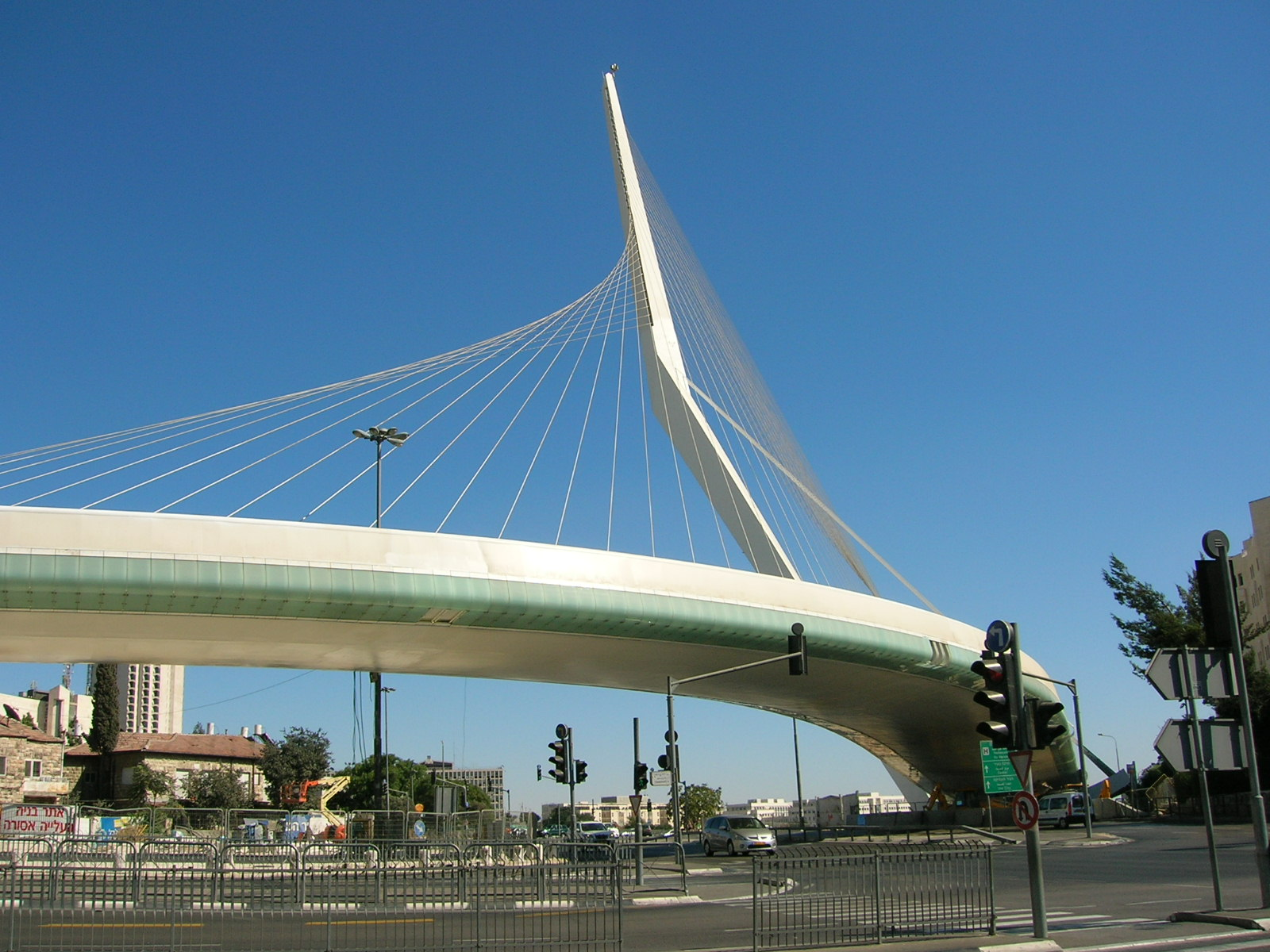
- Coordinates: 31.789°N 35.200°E
- Carries: Jerusalem Light Rail, pedestrians
- Crosses: Shazar Boulevard
- Locale: Jerusalem
- Official name: chords bridge
- Other name(s): Bridge of Strings, Jerusalem

Characteristics
- Design: Side-spar cable-stayed bridge
- Material: Steel, reinforced concrete
- Total length: 360 metres (1,180 ft)
- Width: 14.82 metres (48.6 ft)
- Height: 118 metres (387 ft)
- Longest span: 160 metres (520 ft)
- Clearance below: 3.71 metres (12.2 ft)

Rail characteristics
- No. of tracks: 2
- Track gauge: 1,435 mm (4 ft 8 1/2 in)
- Electrified: Overhead lines

History
- Architect: Santiago Calatrava
- Engineering design by: Santiago Calatrava
- Construction start: 2005
- Construction end: 2008
- Construction cost: NIS 246 million
- Inaugurated: June 25, 2008

Location
- Interactive map of Chords Bridge

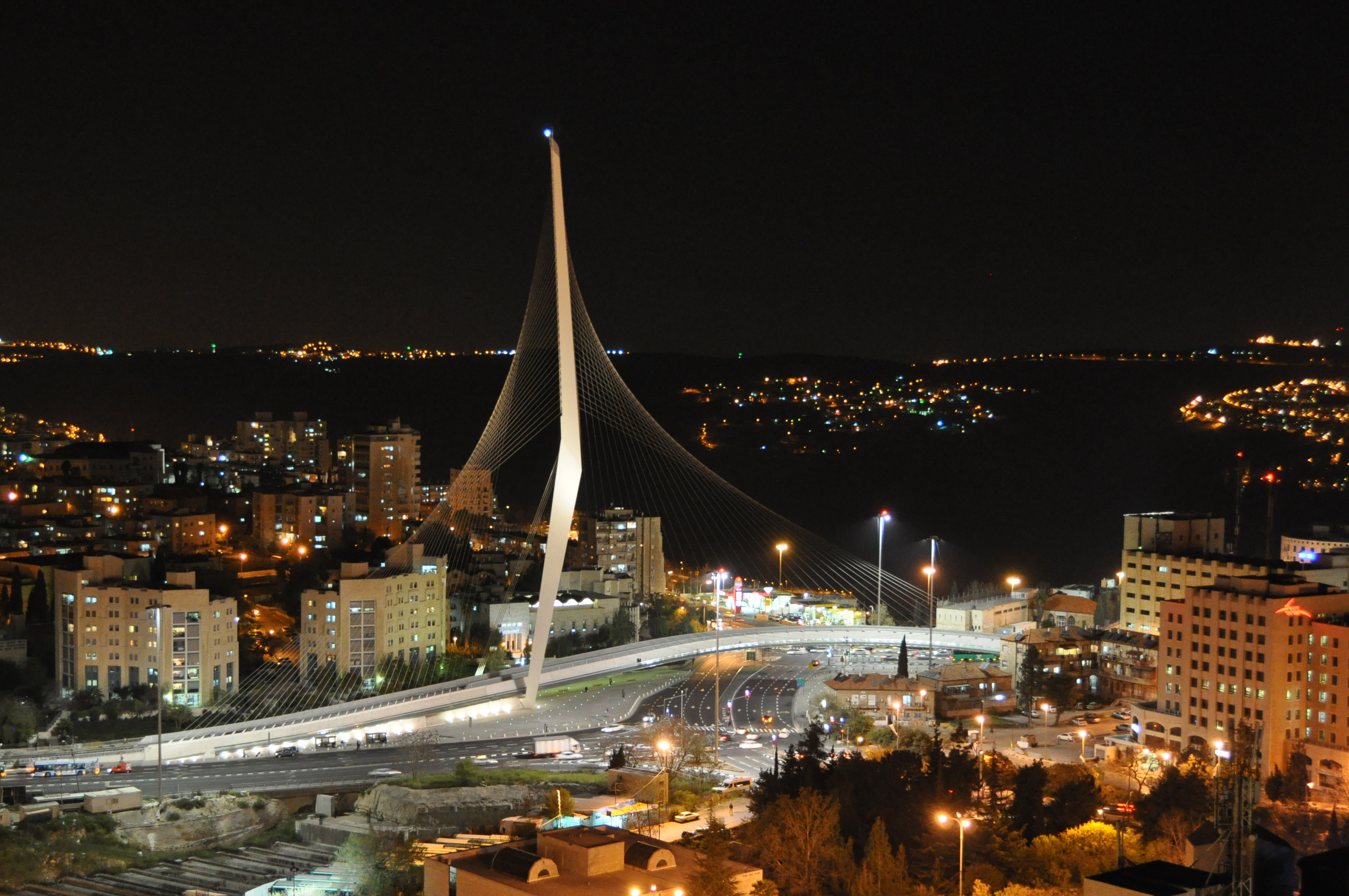
Aerial view of the bridge at night

The Chords Bridge (Hebrew: גשר המיתרים, Gesher HaMeitarim), also called the Bridge of Strings or Jerusalem Light Rail Bridge, is a side-spar cable-stayed bridge in Jerusalem. The structure was designed by the Spanish architect and engineer Santiago Calatrava and is used by Jerusalem Light Rail's Red Line, which began service on August 19, 2011. Incorporated in the bridge is a glass-sided pedestrian bridge enabling pedestrians to cross from Kiryat Moshe to the Jerusalem Central Bus Station. The bridge, which cost about $70 million (NIS 246 million), was inaugurated on June 25, 2008.

== History ==
Calatrava first visited Israel for the opening of an exhibition of his works in Haifa in 1997. During that visit, he was invited to design a pedestrian bridge in Petah Tikva, which was opened in 2005. He was invited to Jerusalem by city engineer Uri Shetrit and former mayor Ehud Olmert, who, according to Calatrava, challenged him to "do the most beautiful contemporary bridge".

Construction of the Chords Bridge began in 2005, with an estimated cost of NIS 129 million, far higher than the initial forecast of NIS 80 million.

== Design and symbolism ==
The bridge was designed to add a defining visual element to the Jerusalem "skyline" at the entrance to the city, and to carry a light rail system, expected to solve some of the city's traffic problems. For Calatrava the bridge is "also the excuse to create a major plaza, to give character and unity to this delicate place".

Similar to Calatrava's Puente del Alamillo in Seville, Spain, the bridge makes use of an angled cantilever tower to absorb some of the load and reduce the number of cable stays needed. The bridge consists of a single pylon counterbalancing a 160-metre (170 yd) span with lengths of cables, making a dramatic architectural statement. While this is Calatrava's 40th bridge, it is the first he has designed to carry both train and pedestrian traffic.

A striking feature of the bridge is a single 118-metre (129 yd) high mast supporting the roadway via 66 steel cables arranged in a parabolic shape which develops three-dimensionally in space, making it the tallest structure in Jerusalem at the time of its completion. The exterior of the bridge is mostly clad in Jerusalem stone, with steel, glass and concrete detailing. Dubbed "Jerusalem's first shrine of modern design" by Time magazine, the bridge has become a tourist attraction.

The form of the bridge resembles a tent in the desert or a harp, with the cables as the strings, symbolising King David's harp, according to some observers, others interpret the looming pylon as the bust of a long-necked bird, a human arm or an arrow caught in a bow.

== Acceptance and criticism ==
The project had many people concerned, but was welcomed with great controversy. Supporters, such as architectural historian David Kroyanker, said that the bridge helps developing western Jerusalem and its modern requirements. Overall, however, the project has been criticized as an extravagant and costly solution to a problem that could have been solved by cheaper means. The final cost of over $70 million exceeding the original budget more than twofold. The aesthetics of the bridge and its impact on Jerusalem have also sparked controversy. Some say the bridge, situated at the city's crowded entrance, does not have enough space around it for people to appreciate its artistic merit, while others feel that the bridge is simply out of its element and question whether it fits visually in the city. The bridge's dedication ceremony, a $500,000 extravaganza, also drew criticism, particularly as young female dancers, subsequently dubbed the "Taliban troupe", were compelled to wear long skirts and cover their hair after ultra-Orthodox Jews threatened to disrupt the ceremony.
