= Alamillo Bridge =

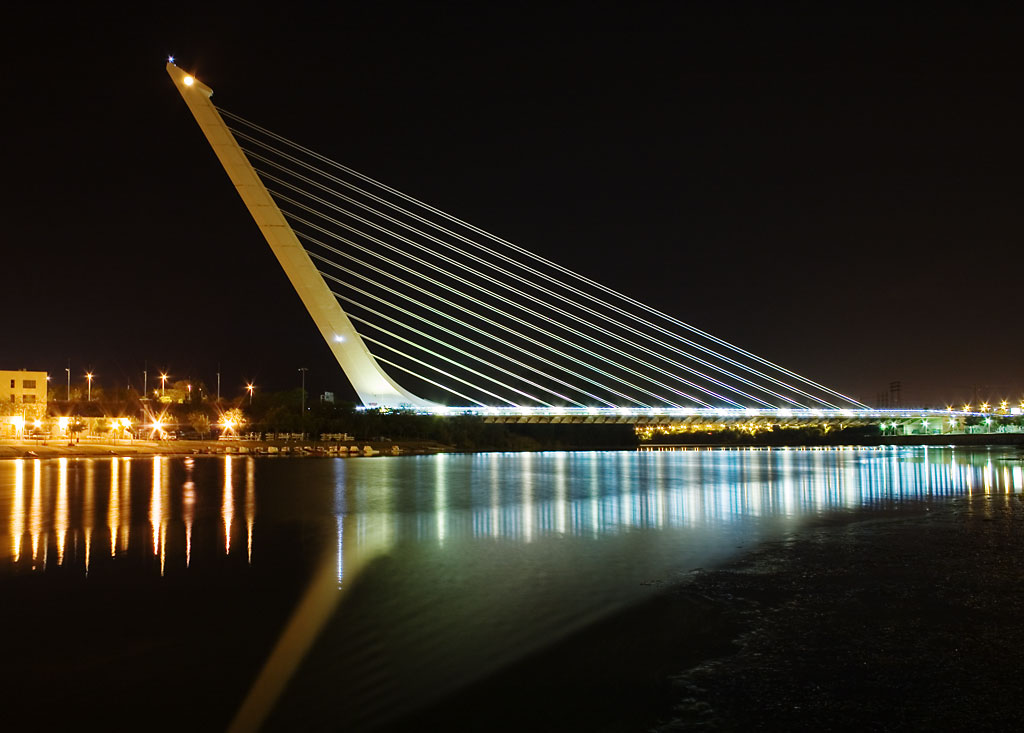
- The Alamillo Bridge at night
- Coordinates: 37°24′48″N 5°59′25″W
- Carries: three lanes of motor vehicles on each side, separate and elevated centre lane for pedestrians and bicycles
- Crosses: Guadalquivir river
- Locale: Seville (Andalusia–Spain)
- Preceded by: Pasarela de San Jerónimo
- Followed by: Puente de la Barqueta

Characteristics
- Design: Cantilever spar cable-stayed bridge with no backstays or anchorage
- Total length: 250 m
- Height: 140 m with tower inclined backward 32 degrees from vertical
- Longest span: 200 m

History
- Designer: Santiago Calatrava

The Alamillo Bridge (Spanish: Puente del Alamillo) is a structure in Seville, Andalucia (Spain), which spans the Canal de Alfonso XIII, allowing access to La Cartuja, a peninsula located between the canal and the Guadalquivir River. The bridge was constructed as part of infrastructure improvements for Expo 92, which was held on large banana farms on the island. Construction of the bridge began in 1989 and was completed in 1992 from a design by Santiago Calatrava.

== Design ==
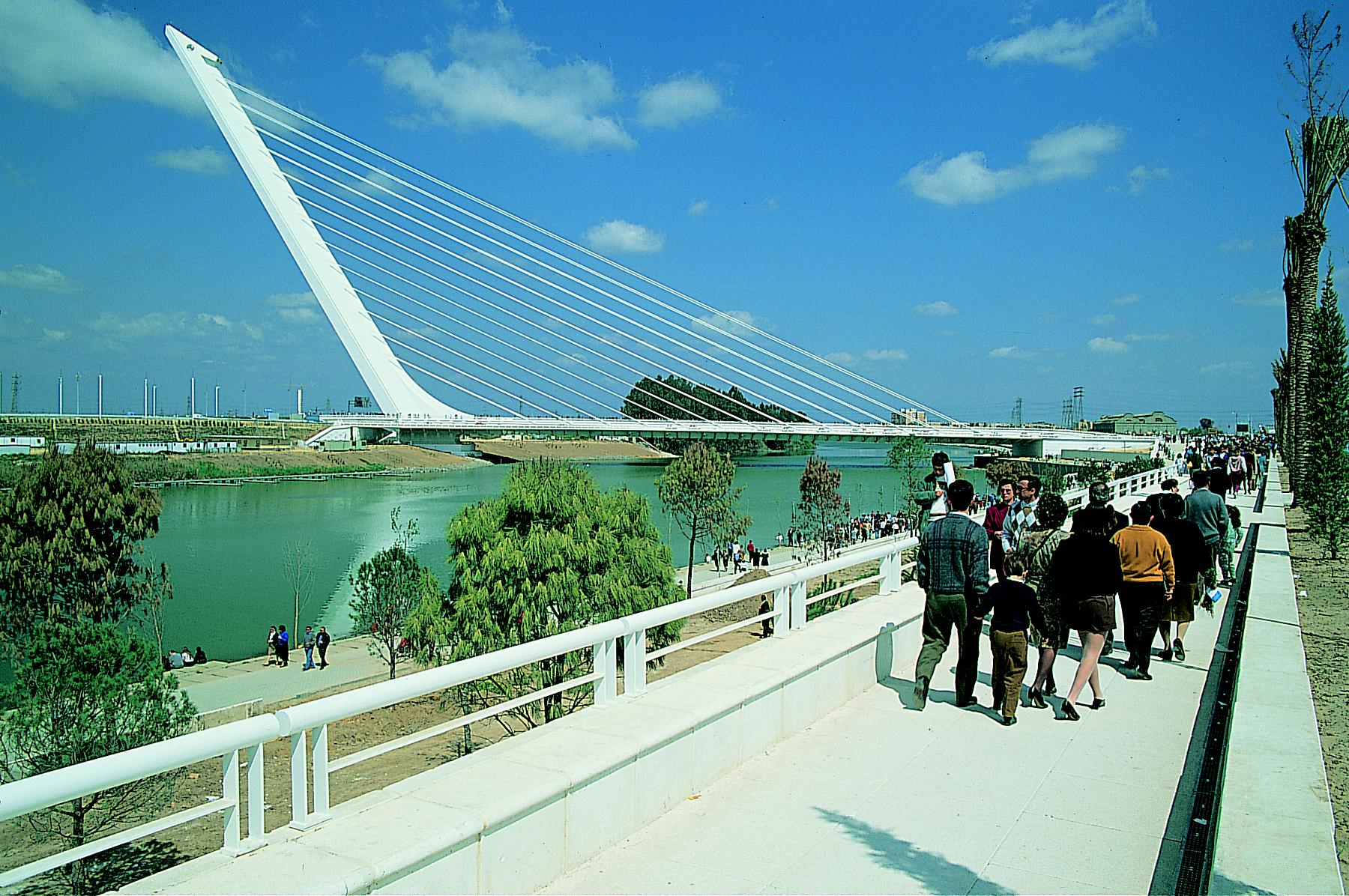
The Puente del Alamillo, viewed from the left (east) side of the Guadalquivir river.

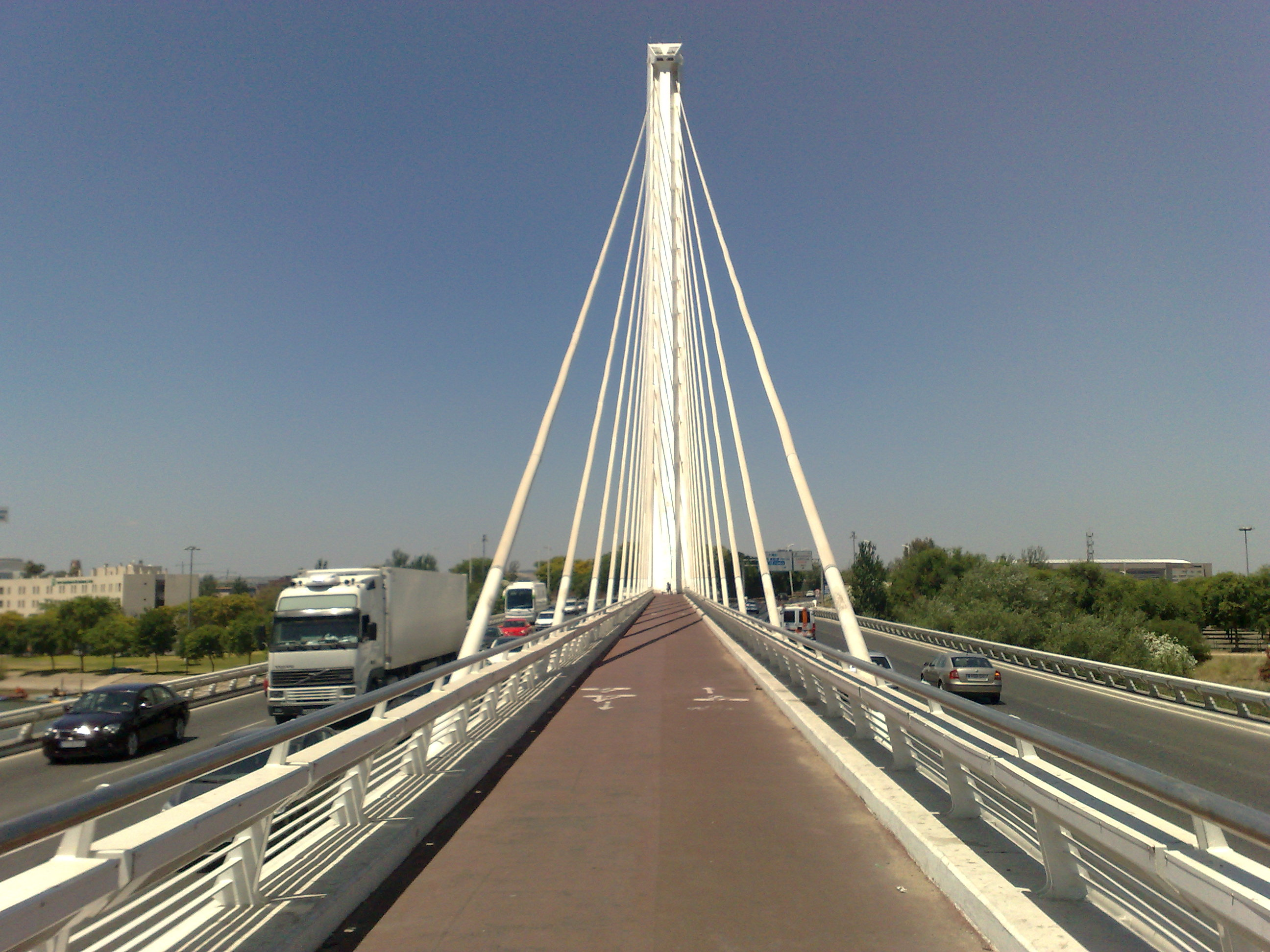
Elevated lane for walkers and bikers, three lanes of traffic on both sides

The static concept of the bridge can be traced back to the 1986 sculpture by Calatrava entitled 'Running Torso', in which inclined stacked marble cubes are balanced by a tensioned wire. The Alamillo Bridge consists of a single straight steel-shell tower, infilled with reinforced concrete and inclined backward, counterbalancing a 200 m span with thirteen pairs of cables. Since the weight of the tower is made to be sufficient to counter-balance the deck, back stays are thus not required, effectively substituting the weight of an inclined tower for one set of stay cables. In this way, a new type of cantilever spar cable-stayed bridge was conceived in 1987.

The original intent was to build two symmetrical bridges on either side of the island, but in the end the Alamillo's singular asymmetric design has proved most striking.

The bridge deck consists of a hexagonal steel-box-beam spine to which the stay cables are attached. Side steel wings cantilevered off the hexagonal spine support the traffic decks, three lanes on each side. The top of the hexagonal spine, elevated 1.6 metres (5 feet) above the road level, serves as an elevated footway and cycle lane in between the traffic lanes.

This bridge represented the soaring aspirations of the city of Seville in preparation for Expo '92, and is visible from the top of La Giralda, the former minaret which is the sentimental roof of the city, linking Seville's past and present. Similar to the Brooklyn Bridge, there is an elevated walkway for pedestrians. In addition to the elevated walkway, the Alamillo Bridge features a lookout at the top of the inclined tower, accessible by a stairway enclosed within the tower.

The Alamillo Bridge is the first cable-stayed bridge that is balanced solely through the weight of the massive tower, not requiring any type of back stays or anchorage. There are 54 steel piles under the bridge, acting passively under the tower. Calatrava's Sundial Bridge in Redding, California (2004), the Mesoghion Avenue Footbridge in Athens and Chords Bridge in Jerusalem (2008) are similar in design to the Alamillo Bridge.

== Critique ==
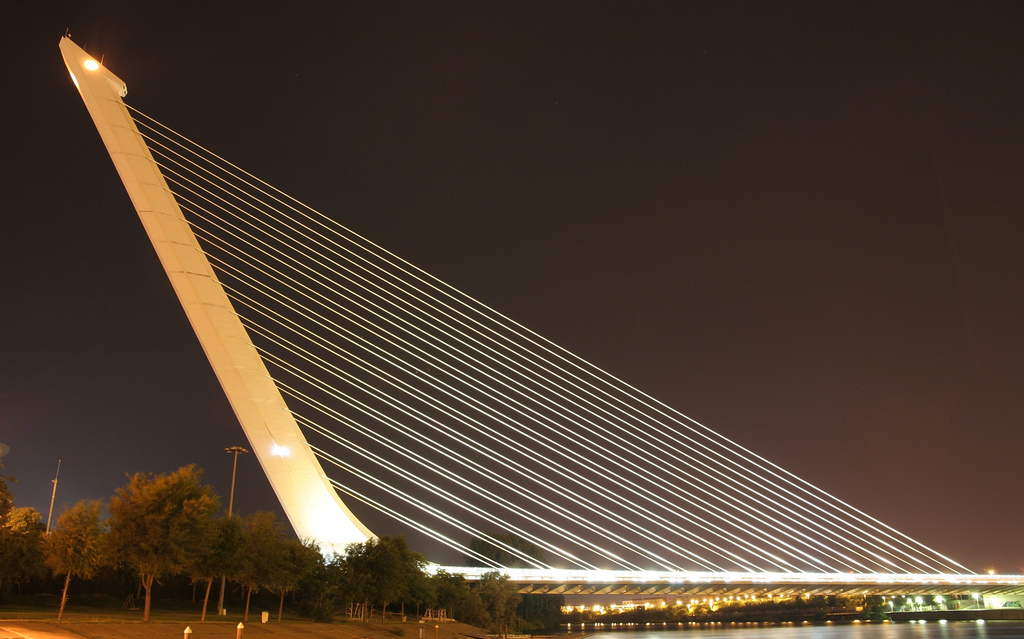
1992 Alamillo Bridge

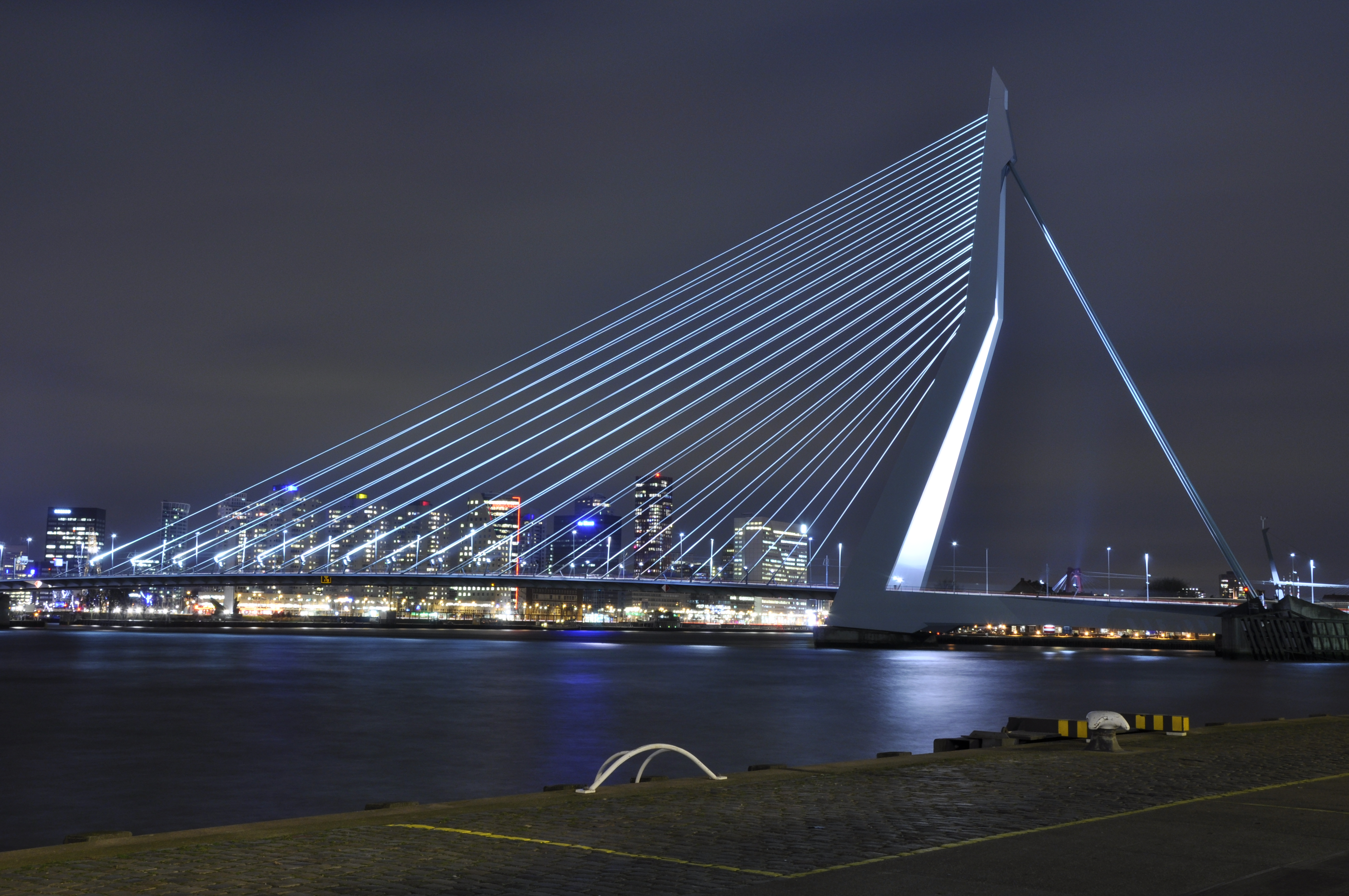
1996 Erasmus Bridge

While the Alamillo Bridge is dramatic and widely acclaimed aesthetically, an analysis of its structural engineering show that it has an inefficient dynamic structural form because of the lack of backstays or anchorage to provide a restoring force under changing loads. One indication of this is the extreme weight of the pylon member needed in the Alamillo Bridge compared with other cable-stayed bridges such as the Erasmus Bridge in Rotterdam, which has a backward-inclined pylon and backstays. The total mass of the pylon of the Alamillo Bridge is over 10 times the pylon mass of the Erasmus Bridge, which has even a longer span than the Alamillo.

== See also ==
- Puente de la Mujer, Buenos Aires, Argentina
- Samuel Beckett Bridge, Dublin, Ireland
- Sundial Bridge at Turtle Bay, California, United States
- Puente de la Unidad, Monterrey, Mexico
- Erasmus Bridge, Rotterdam, Netherlands
