= City of Arts and Sciences =

Cultural complex in Valencia, Spain

- Valencian: Ciutat de les Arts i les Ciències
- Spanish: Ciudad de las Artes y las Ciencias
- Interactive map of City of Arts and Sciences
- Location: Valencia, Spain
- Coordinates: 39°27′15″N 00°21′00″W
- Owner: Ciudad de las Artes y las Ciencias, S.A. (CACSA)

Construction
- Opened: L'Hemisfèric (1998), Museu de les Ciències Príncipe Felipe (2000), L'Umbracle (2001), L'Oceanogràfic (2003), Palau de les Arts Reina Sofía (2005), Montolivet Bridge (2007), Assut de l'Or Bridge (2008), L'Àgora (2009)
- Cost: 1,200 million euros
- Architects: Santiago Calatrava, Félix Candela (L'Oceanogràfic)

Website
- www.cac.es/en/home.html

The City of Arts and Sciences (Valencian: Ciutat de les Arts i les Ciències, Spanish: Ciudad de las Artes y las Ciencias) (Note: Pronunciation, Valencian: [siwˈtad de les ˈaɾts i les siˈɛnsies], Spanish: [θjuˈðað ðe las ˈaɾtes i las ˈθjenθjas].) is a cultural and architectural complex in the city of Valencia, Spain. It is the most important modern tourist destination in the city of Valencia and one of the 12 Treasures of Spain.

The City of Arts and Sciences is situated at the southeast end of the former riverbed of the river Turia, which was drained and rerouted after a catastrophic flood in 1957. The old riverbed was turned into a picturesque sunken park.

Designed by Santiago Calatrava and Félix Candela, the project began the first stages of construction in July 1996, and was inaugurated on 16 April 1998 with the opening of L'Hemisfèric. The last major component of the City of Arts and Sciences, Palau de les Arts Reina Sofía, was inaugurated on 9 October 2005, Valencian Community Day. The most recent building in the complex, L'Àgora, was opened in 2009.

Originally budgeted at €300 million in 1991 for three structures, additional structures were added, contributing to a three-fold increase from that initial expected cost.

== Buildings and structures ==
The complex is made up of the following buildings and structures, presented in the order of their inauguration:

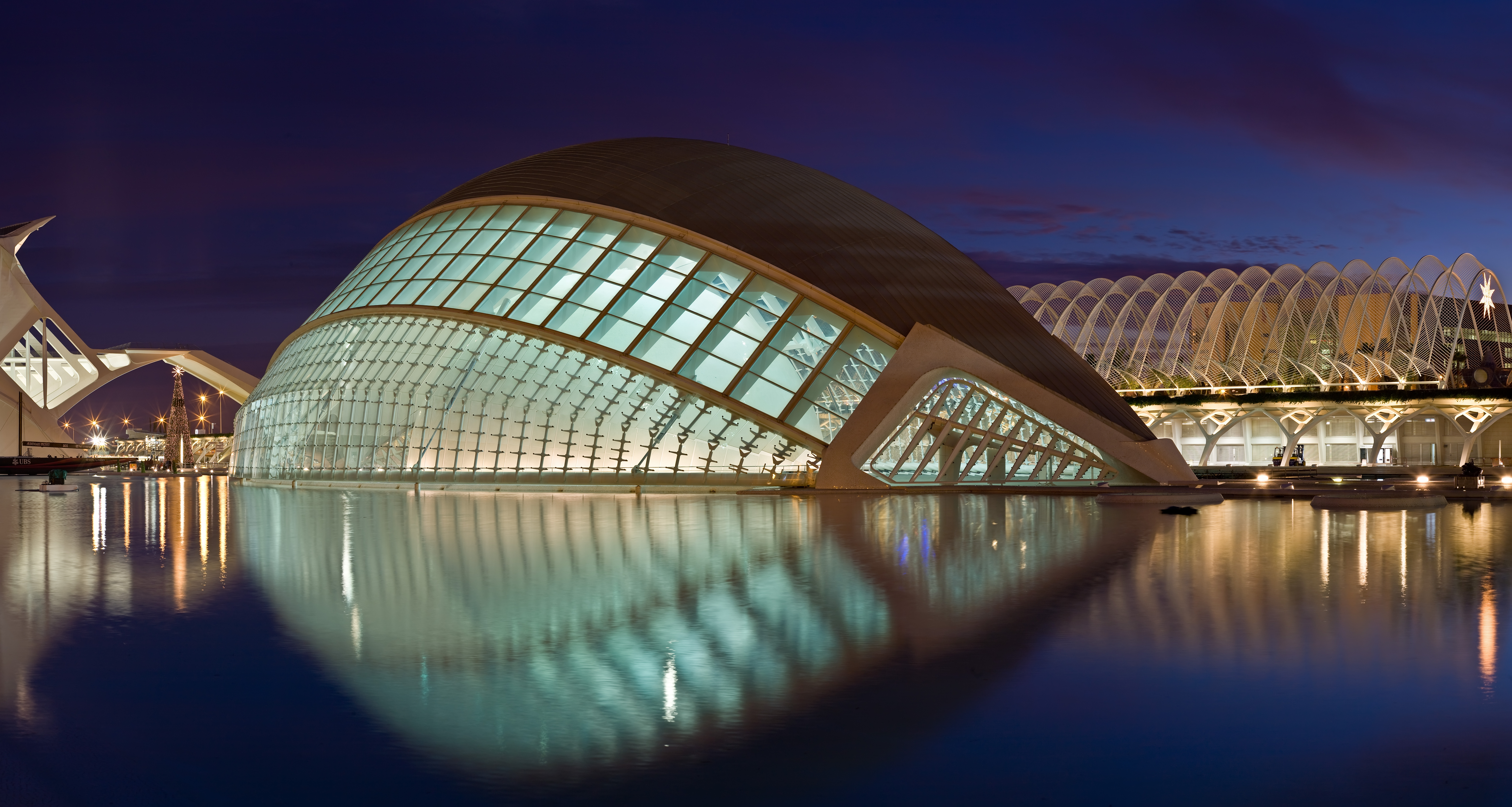
L'Hemisfèric

- L'Hemisfèric (1998) – an IMAX Cinema, planetarium and laserium. The building is meant to resemble a giant eye, and has an approximate surface of 13,000 m^{2} (139,931 sq ft). The Hemisfèric, also known as the planetarium or the "eye of knowledge", is the centerpiece of the City of Arts and Sciences. It was the first building completed in 1998. Its design resembles an eyelid that opens to access the surrounding water pool. The bottom of the pool is glass, creating the illusion of the eye as a whole. This planetarium is a half-sphere in a concrete structure 110 meters (360 ft) long and 55.5 meters (182 ft) wide. The shutter is built of elongated aluminum awnings that fold upward collectively to form a brise soleil roof that opens along the curved axis of the eye. It opens to reveal the dome, the "iris" of the eye, which is the planetarium or Ominax theater. The structure is divided in half by a set of stairs that descend into the vaulted concrete lobby. The underground spaces are illuminated with the use of translucent glass panels within the walking path. The transparent roof is supported by concrete arches that connect to the sunken gallery. There is a remarkable echo in the building and if two people stand at the two opposite pillars inside of the eye they can speak with each other.

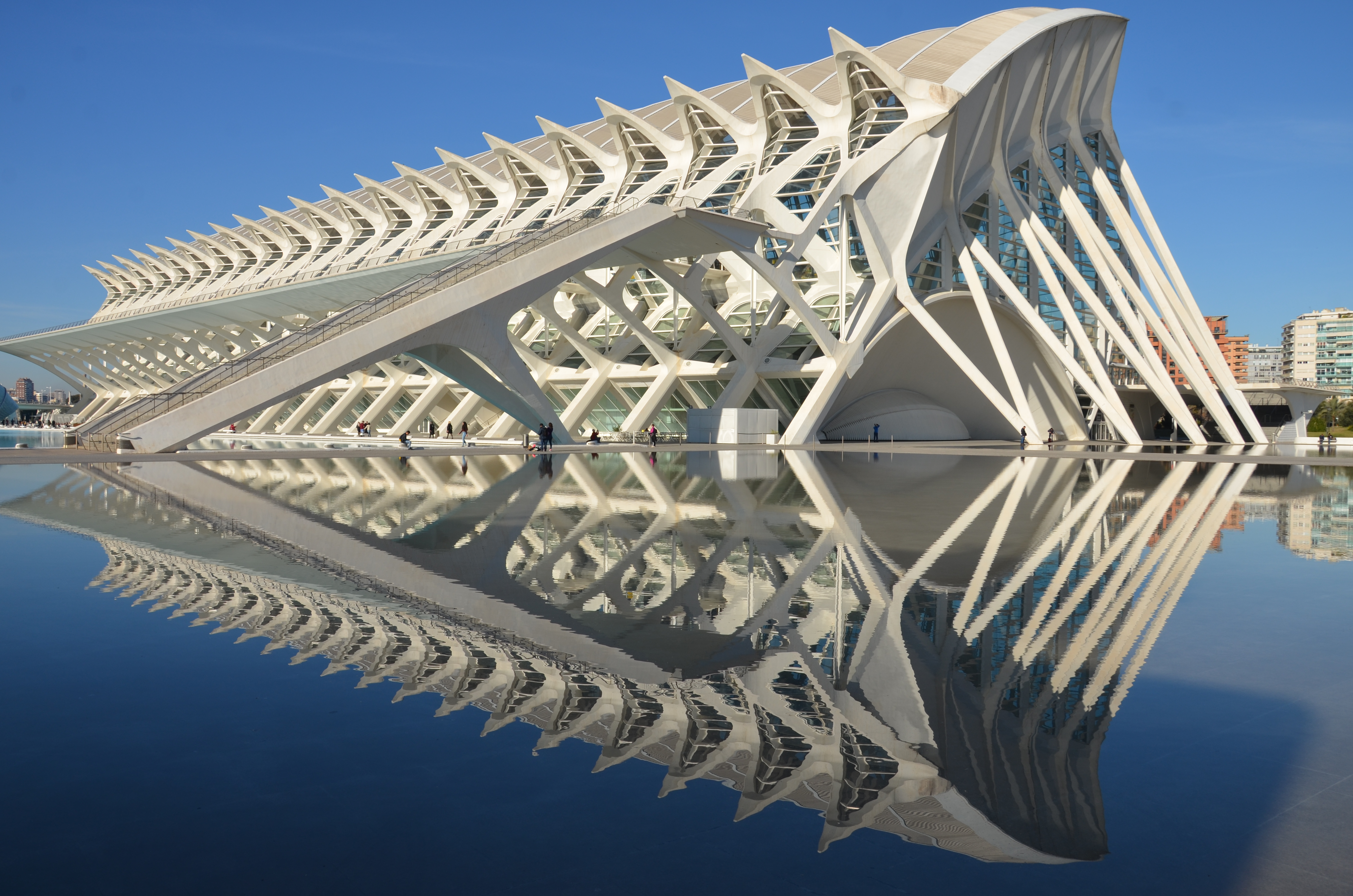
Museo de las Ciencias Príncipe Felipe

- Museu de les Ciències Príncipe Felipe (2000) – an interactive museum of science that resembles the skeleton of a whale. It occupies around 40,000 m^{2} (430,556 sq ft) on three floors. Much of the ground floor is taken up by a basketball court sponsored by a local team and various companies. The building has three floors, of which 26,000 square meters (280,000 sq ft) is used for exhibitions. The first floor has a view of the Turia Garden that surrounds it, which is over 13,500 square meters of water. The second floor hosts "The Legacy of Science" exhibition by researchers Santiago Ramón y Cajal and Severo Ochoa y Jean Dausset. The third floor is known as the "Chromosome Forest" and shows the sequencing of human DNA. Also on this floor are the "Zero Gravity," "Space Academy" and "Marvel Superheroes" exhibitions. The building's architecture is known for its geometry, structure, use of materials, and its design around nature. The building is about 42,000 square meters (452,084 sq ft), of which 26,000 square meters (279,862 sq ft) is exhibition space, making it the largest in Spain. It has 20,000 square meters (215,278 sq ft) of glass, 4,000 panes, 58,000 m^{3} (2,048,251 cu ft) of concrete, and 14,000 tons of steel. The building stands 220 meters (720 ft) long, 80 meters (260 ft) wide and 55 meters (180 ft) high.

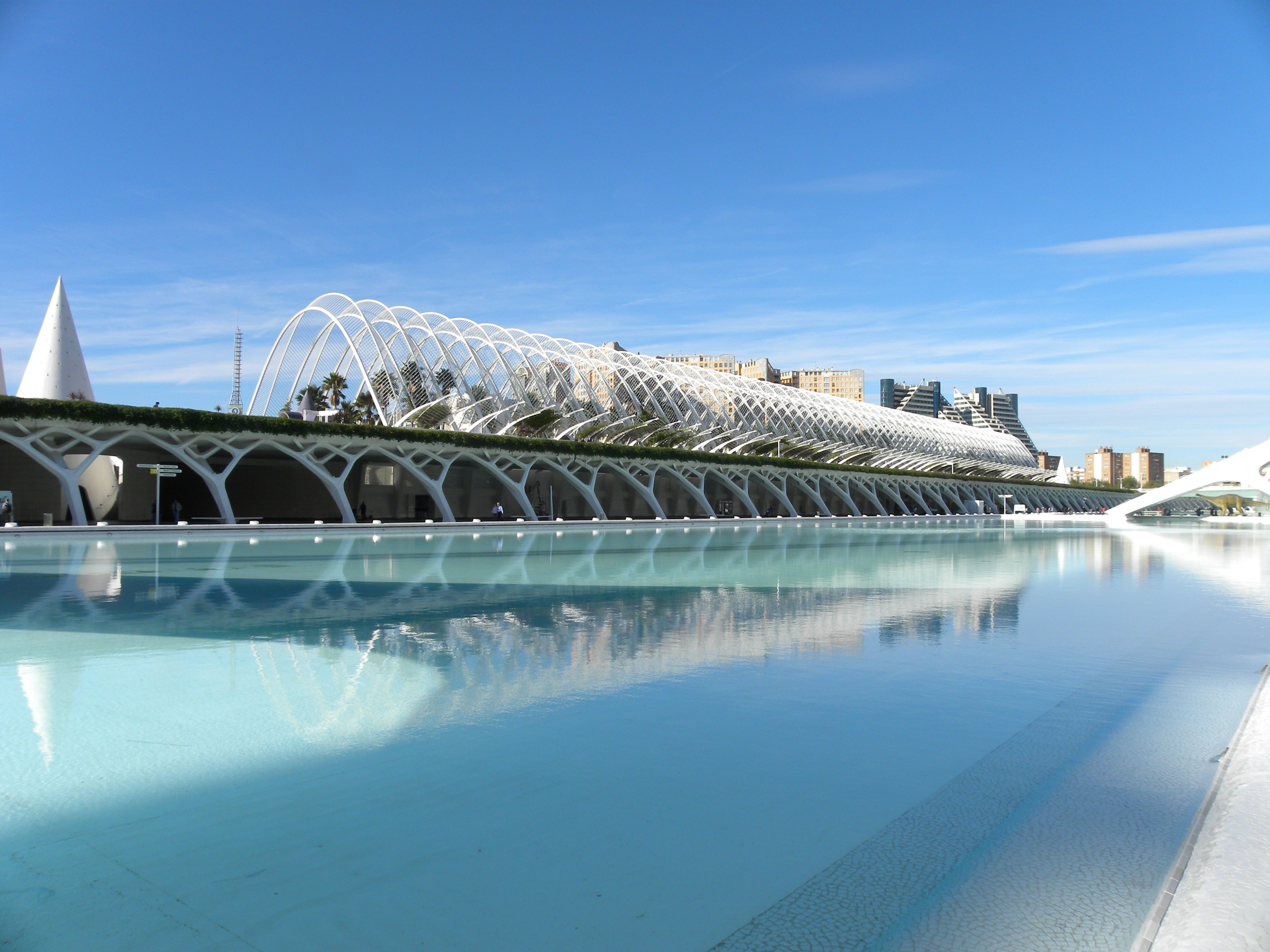
L'Umbracle, built over a car park

- L'Umbracle (2001) – an open structure enveloping a landscaped walk with plant species indigenous to Valencia (such as rockrose, lentisca, rosemary, lavender, honeysuckle, bougainvillea and palm trees). It harbors in its interior The Walk of the Sculptures, an outdoor art gallery with sculptures by contemporary artists (Miquel of Navarre, Francesc Abbot, Yoko Ono and others). The Umbracle is also home to numerous free-standing sculptures surrounded by nature. It was designed as an entrance to the City of Arts and Sciences. It is 320 meters (1,050 ft) long and 60 meters (197 ft) wide, located on the southern side of the complex. It includes 55 fixed arches and 54 floating arches that stand 18 meters (59 ft) high. The plants displayed were carefully picked to change colour with each season. The garden includes 99 palm trees, 78 small palm trees, and 62 bitter orange trees. There are 42 varieties of shrubs from the Region of Valencia including cistuses, mastics, buddleia, pampas grass, and plumbagos. In the garden there are 16 species of Mirabilis jalapa, or the four-o'clock flower ("beauty of the night"). Honeysuckle and hanging bougainvillea are two of the 450 climbing plants in L'Umbracle. There also are 5,500 ground cover plants such as lotus, agatea, Spanish flags, and fig-marigolds. There are over a hundred aromatic plants including rosemary and lavender.

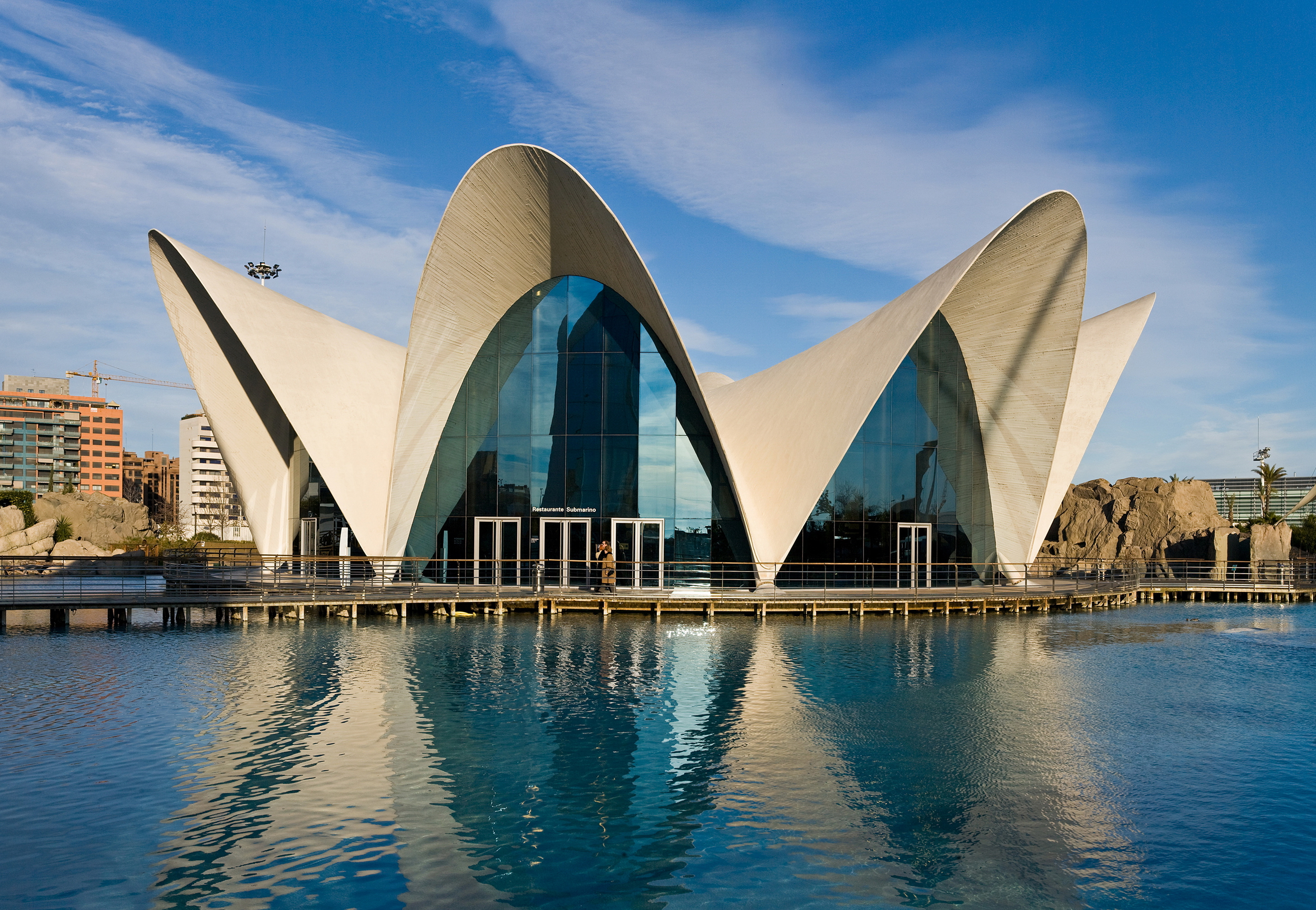
L'Oceanogràfic

- L'Oceanogràfic (2003) – an open-air oceanographic park. It is the largest oceanographic aquarium in Europe with 110,000 square meters (1,184,030 sq ft) and 42,000,000 liters (9,200,000 imp gal; 11,000,000 U.S. gal) of water. It was built in the shape of a water lily and is the work of architect Félix Candela. Each building represents different aquatic environments including the Mediterranean, wetlands, temperate and tropical seas, the Antarctic, the Arctic, islands and the Red Sea. This aquarium is a home to over 500 different species including dolphins, belugas, sawfish, jellyfish, starfish, sea urchins, walruses, sea lions, seals, penguins, turtles, sharks and rays. It also houses wetland bird species.

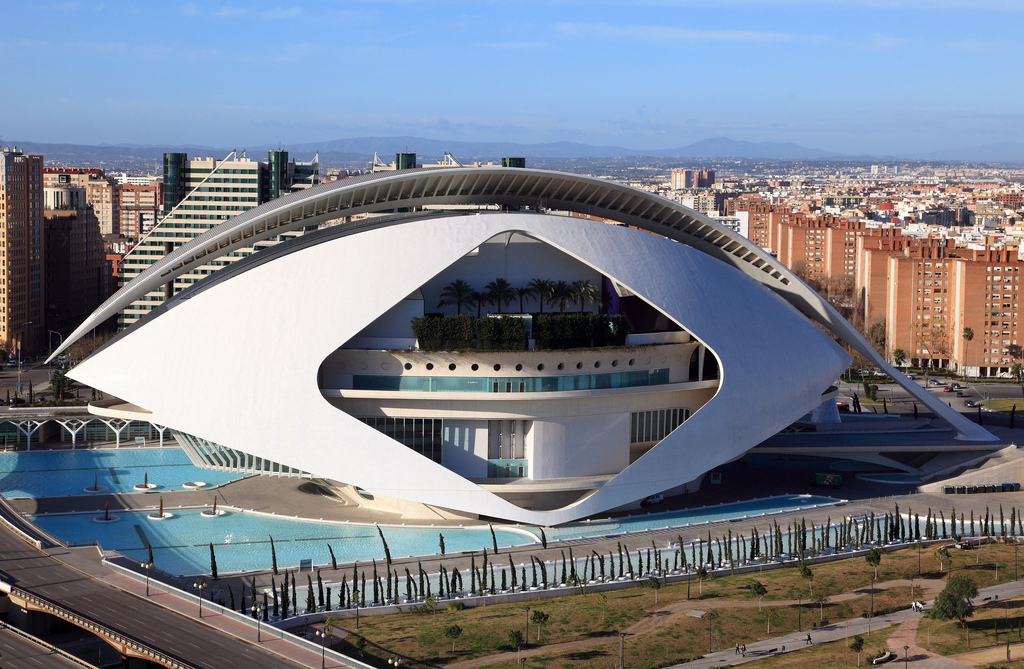
Palau de les Arts Reina Sofía

- Palau de les Arts Reina Sofía (2005) – an opera house and performing arts center dedicated to music and the performing arts. It is surrounded by 87,000 square meters (936,460 sq ft) of landscape and water, as well as 10,000 square meters (107,639 sq ft) of walking area. The Palau de Les Arts has four sections: the main hall, the master hall, the auditorium, and the Martin y Soler theatre. It holds many events such as opera, theatre and music in its auditoriums. Panoramic lifts and stairways connect platforms at different heights on the inside of the metallic frames of the building. The building has a metallic feather outer roof that is 230 meters long and 70 meters high. The building is supported by white concrete. Two laminated steel shells cover the building, weighing over 3,000 tons. These shells are 163 meters wide and 163 meters long.

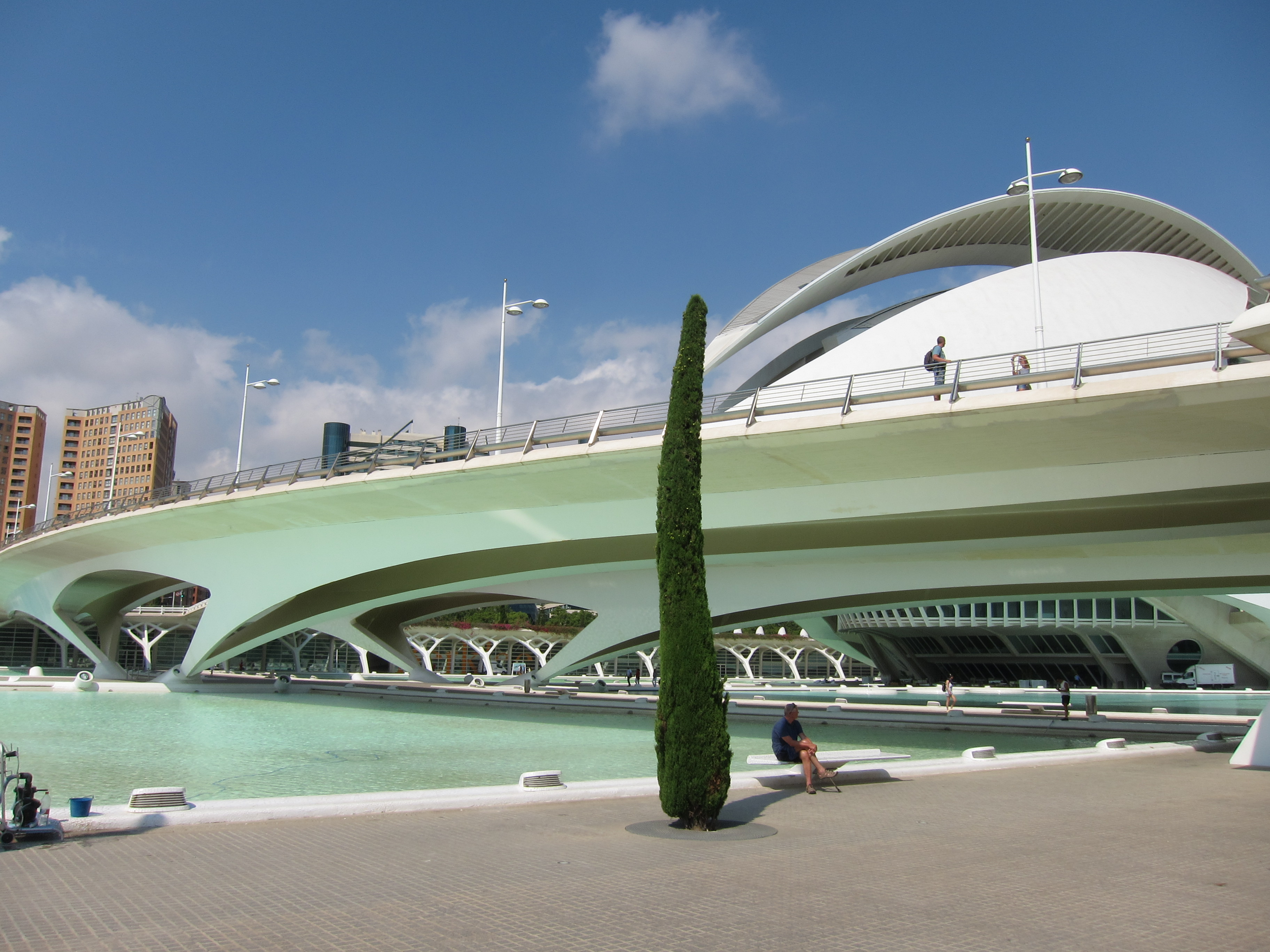
Montolivet Bridge, newer southern segment

- Montolivet Bridge (2007) - concrete road bridge crossing the dry Turia riverbed that consists of an older straight-roadway northern segment with column piers designed by Fernández Ordóñez (1933–2000) connected with a newer curved-roadway southern segment with white arch point supports designed by Santiago Calatrava, located in between, and complementing his design of, Palua de les Arts Reina Sofía and L'Hemisferic.

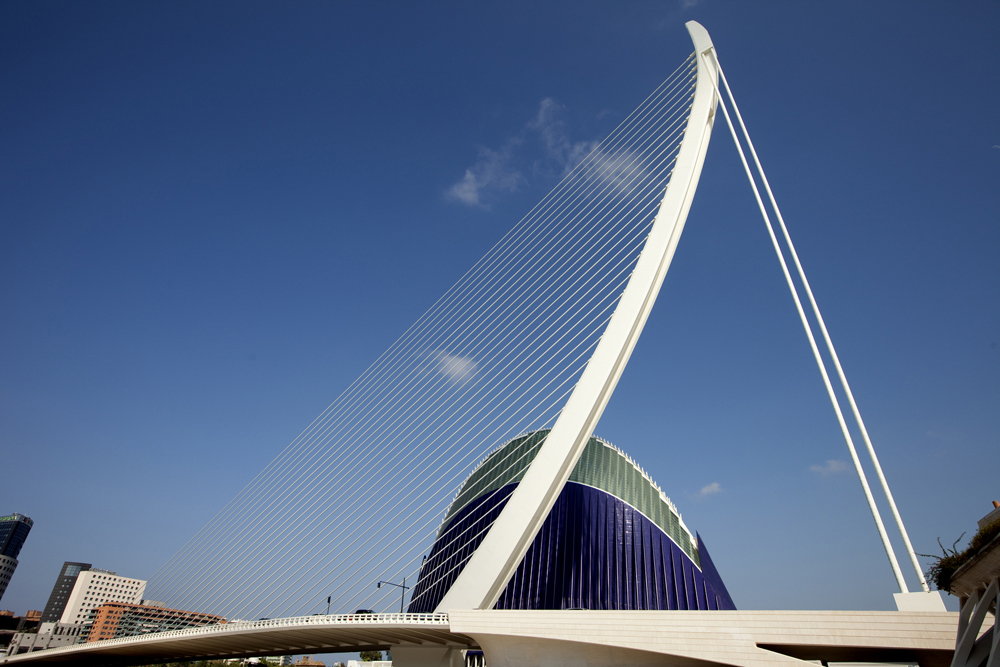
Assut de l'Or Bridge

- Assut de l'Or Bridge (2008) – a white cable-stayed bridge sustained by a curved pylon with backstayed counterweights, crossing the dry Turia riverbed, connecting the south side with Minorca Street, in between El Museu de les Ciències and L'Agora. The pylon of the bridge, at 125 meters (410 ft) high, is the highest point in the city.

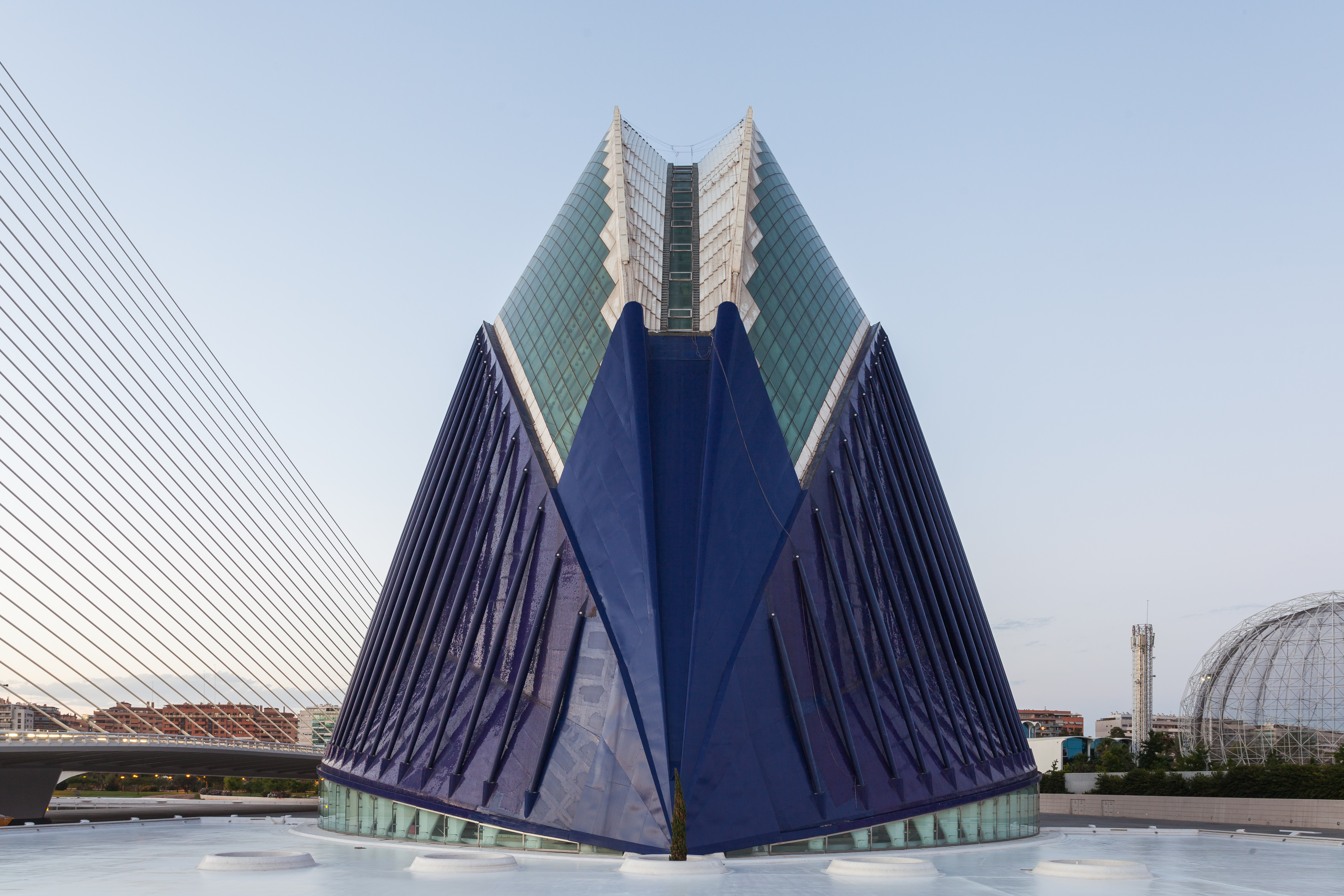
L'Àgora

- L'Àgora (2009) – a covered plaza in which concerts and sporting events (such as the Valencia Open 500) are held. The Agora is a space designed to hold a variety of events such as concerts, performances, exhibitions, conventions, staging of congresses, and international sports meetings. Many important events have been held in this building, including the Freestyle Burn Spanish Cup in 2010 and the Christmas Special Program.
- Valencia Towers – part of a Calatrava project (2005) to complete the City of Arts and Sciences with the additional construction, then estimated to take more than two decades to complete, of three sculptural towers of 308, 266 and 220 m tall, which symbolize the cities of Valencia, Alicante and Castellón, respectively. The proposed project has been put on hold.

== History ==
=== Origins of the project ===
In 1989, the president of the Valencian Autonomous Government, Joan Lerma, after a visit to the new Cité des Sciences et de l'Industrie in Paris, and through the general director of planning and studies of the Presidency of the Generalitat Valenciana, José María Bernabé, officially commissioned the scientist Antonio Ten Ros to draft a first proposal for a City of Science and Technology for Valencia.

Ten Ros drew up a first draft, entitled "Vilanova, A City of Science for Valencia", which was officially presented to the Generalitat in May 1989. After that, he was formally commissioned in 1990 to direct the creation of a general draft amounting to 92,650,000 pesetas (556,000 euros), to be managed by the University of Valencia. Antonio Ten Ros assembled a team of 56 scientists, museologists and designers including Professor José María López Piñero as responsible for the space "A walk through history". Ten Ros presented the draft in 32 volumes to President Lerma in the Palace of the Generalitat on 21 December 1991.

The "City of Science and Communications" was the name that the autonomous government gave to the initiative, and plans included a 370 m high communications tower, which would have been the third highest one in the world at that time; a planetarium; and a museum of science. The total price of the works was estimated to be about 25,000 million pesetas.

In May 1991, the council approved the transfer of lands. Four months later the project plan with three structures (communications tower, planetarium, and a science museum) was presented, designed by Santiago Calatrava.

The team that had designed the museum did not see eye to eye with the form in which Santiago Calatrava conceived the building, and a couple of changes were made. Preliminary site work began by the end of 1994.

The project was not without controversy. The Conservative Popular Party saw in the City of Science a "work of the pharaohs" that would serve only to swell the ego of the Socialists, who were the driving forces behind the initiative.

=== Expanded plan and construction ===
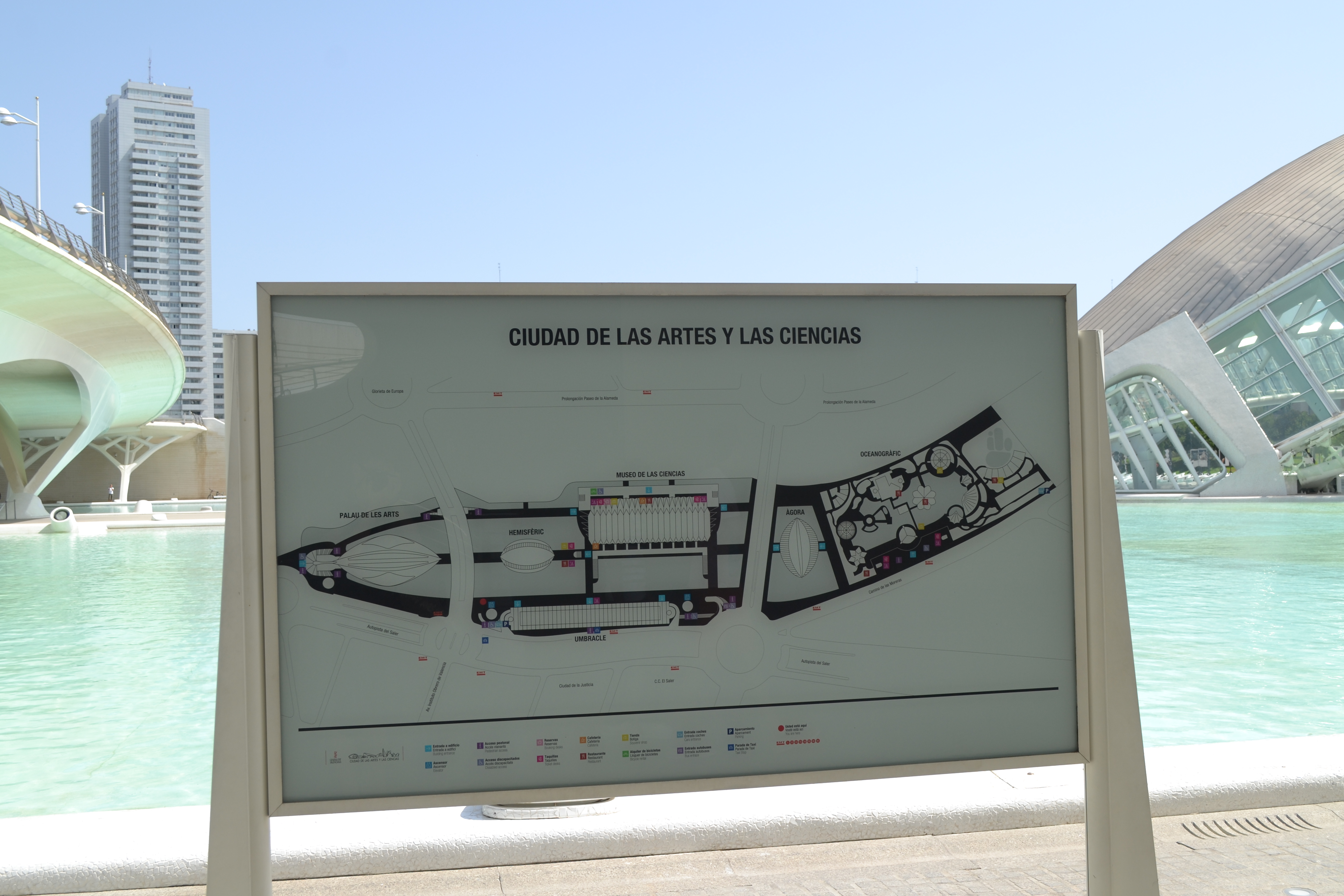
Plan: longitudinal axis bisects Palau de les Arts Reina Sofía, Montolivet Bridge, L'Hemisferic, and extends through L'Agora to L'Oceanografic

In 1995, the Popular Party won against the Socialists. However, several successive Popular Party governments continued and expanded the complex far beyond the original Socialist project at an enormous cost, heavily indebting the city.

After a change of government in 1996, the planned telecommunication tower was cancelled and replaced by an opera house, which was more expensive, and architect Félix Candela was added to design an oceanographic park, all of which led to underspecified increases in the project budget and to updating the name to City of Arts and Sciences. In July 1996, the original Valencia, Ciencia y Comunicaciones was officially changed to Ciudad de las Artes y las Ciencias, S.A. (CACSA). Construction on the City of Arts and Sciences under CACSA began July 1996. When construction started in 1997 on the Palau de les Arts, it was built with the same foundation and the same contract that had been planned for the cancelled communications tower.

The revised plan (by Calatrava) exhibited a strong longitudinal axis that defined the backbone tying together all the structures of the complex. It bisected the Opera House, Montolivet Bridge, L'Hemisferic, and extended through the Assut de L'Or Bridge and L'Agora (commissioned later in 2005) to L'Oceanografic (designed by Candela). Parallel to the axis were placed the science museum, L'Umbracle, raised promenades and reflecting pools.

As the site is close to the sea, and Valencia is so dry, I decided to make water a major element for the whole site using it as a mirror for the architecture. --Santiago Calatrava

Another unifying element was the use of the city’s traditional heritage, viz., the use of ceramic mosaic tiles known as “trencadis”, which was widely used as the exterior layer over the concrete surfaces of many of the buildings/structures and elements of the promenade throughout the complex.

Construction continued on the site until the last structure, L'Agora, was completed in 2009. The total cost of the project came in at 1,200 million euros.

=== Inauguration ===
In April 1998, the complex opened its doors to the public with L'Hemisfèric. Eleven months later, the President of Valencia, Eduardo Zaplana, inaugurated the Museu de les Ciències Príncipe Felipe, although the museum was not yet finished. The museum was opened to the public twenty months later. On 12 December 2002 was the opening of L'Oceanogràfic, the largest aquarium built in Europe. Queen Sofía, on 8 October 2005, inaugurated the Palau de les Arts Reina Sofía, which became the opera house of Valencia.

=== Architects: Santiago Calatrava and Félix Candela ===
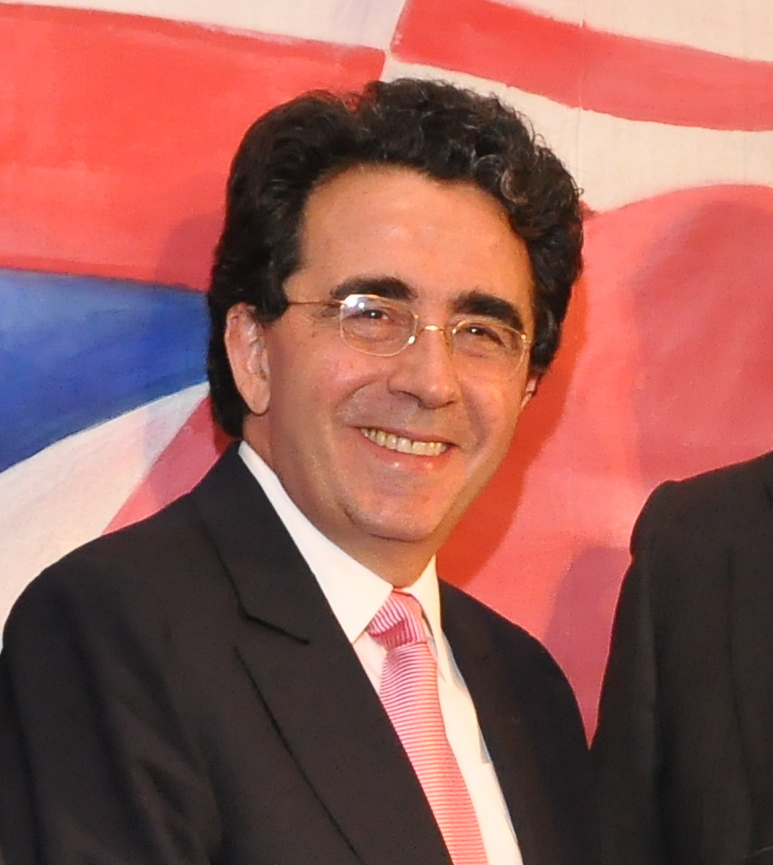
Santiago Calatrava in 2010

Santiago Calatrava was born in Valencia, Spain, on 28 July 1951. He is an architect and engineer also known for his skills in painting and sculpting. He attended the Art Academy in Valencia in the mid-1960s; then he earned a degree in architecture and a postgraduate course in city planning at the Escuela Tecnica Superior de Arquitectura, studied civil engineering at the Federal Polytechnic University of Zurich, and participated in academic research investigating the foldability of space frames.

Calatrava's architecture aims to unite structure and movement. Early in his career, Calatrava designed Stadelhofen Station in Zurich. He was recognized for his achievement in creating poetics of movement and integrating public transportation in a natural setting and urban context. Another theme in his work was moving contraptions in his buildings; for example, his dome for the Reichstag Conversion Competition in Berlin opens and closes like a flower, and the Planetarium in the City of Arts and Sciences in Valencia opens and closes like eyelids.

Félix Candela was born on 27 January 1910 in Madrid, Spain, and died on 7 December 1997. His architectural designs are composed of reinforced concrete structures distinguished by thin, curved shells. His popularity sprung from his design, in collaboration with Jorge Gonzales Reyna, of the Cosmic Rays Pavilion (1951) in Mexico. He used his signature design of the reinforced concrete roof that varies in thickness from only 5/8 inch to 2 inches. He also built the church of La Virgin Milagrosa in Mexico City and the church of San Vicente de Paul. His designs consisted of warped-shell industrial buildings, thin-shell centenary, and barrel-vaulted factories and warehouses. Candela was also a teacher at Harvard University and the University of Illinois. Felix Candela designed the underwater city L'Oceanogràfic in the City of Arts and Sciences in Valencia, reminiscent of Antoni Gaudí's work in Barcelona.

=== In popular culture ===
Parts of the musical number "Style" from the 2007 Indian film Sivaji were shot at the City of Arts and Sciences. Portions of the area were featured in the 2013 racing game Gran Turismo 6 as a photo location. Exterior scenes of the futuristic city in the 2015 film Tomorrowland were filmed around the complex.

In 2016 (broadcast in 2017) it was used as a filming location for the British science-fiction television programme Doctor Who, appearing in the second episode of the tenth series, "Smile". The location was used as the headquarters of the company DELOS in the third season of the HBO series Westworld. In 2023, it served as part of the planet of Coruscant for the second season of the Star Wars show Andor.

Various exterior shots of the complex were used to depict a conceptual 2039 New York World's Fair for the season finale of Cosmos: Possible Worlds on National Geographic. Architectural elements from the site were used as a green screen backdrop for the futuristic 2720 city in the 2020 film Bill & Ted Face the Music It was also used as the set of the 2020 television adaptation of Brave New World. Parts of the shooting for the 2021 TV series Intergalactic and for the 2025 TV series Andor are also done in the City of Arts and Sciences.

In 2024, MiSaMo, a sub-unit of K-pop girl group Twice, filmed parts of the Identity music video on YouTube at the City of Arts and Science.

== Economic impact ==
In 2019 it was reported that the economic impact of the complex is €113 million a year and generated 3,509 jobs.

== Gallery ==
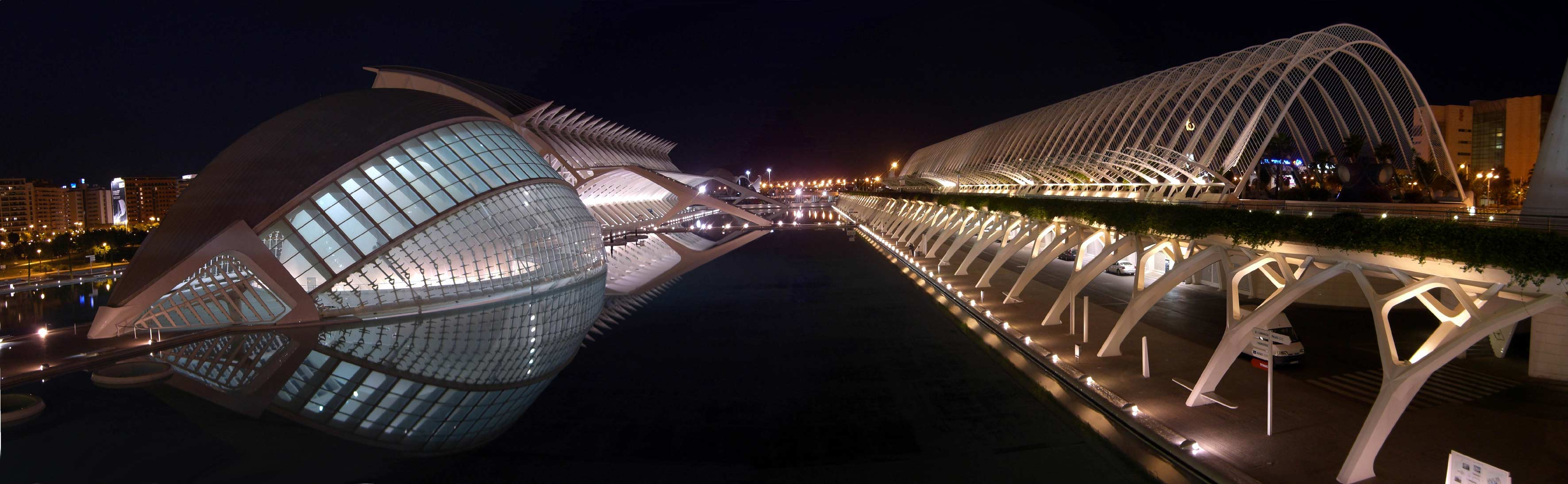
Panorama (2007, before Assut de l'Or Bridge and Ágora were built)

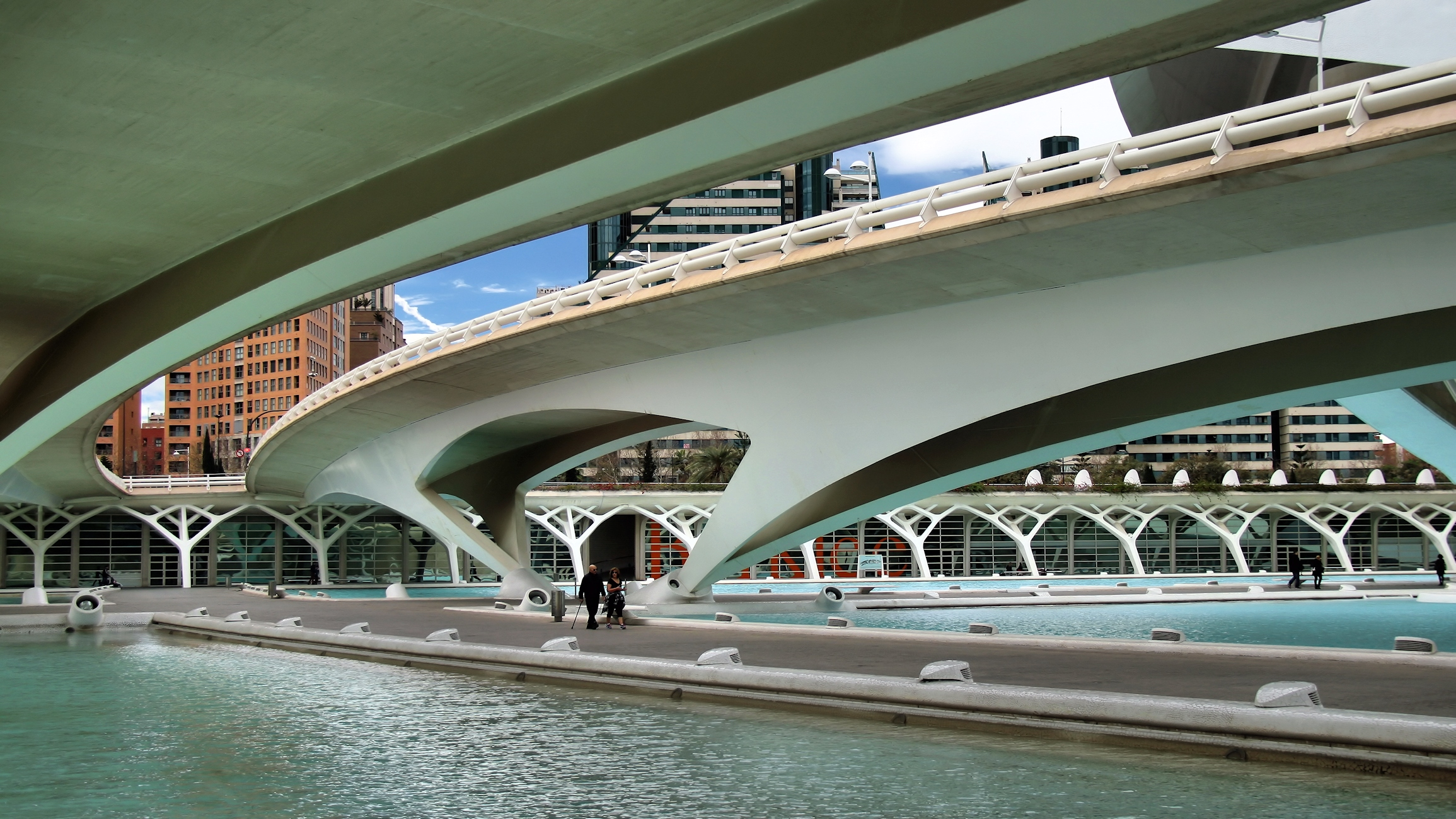
Pont de Montolivet

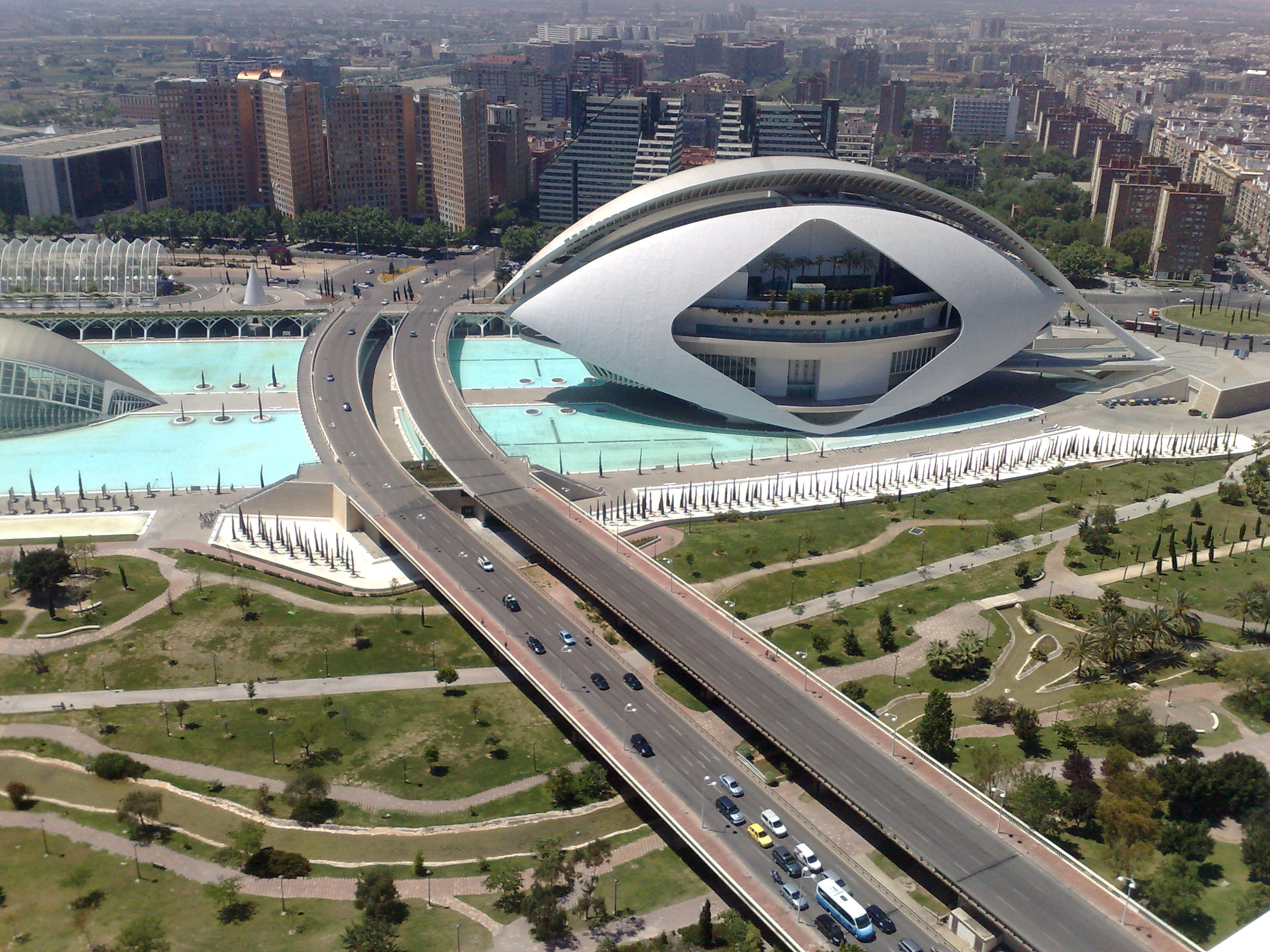
Palau de les Arts Reina Sofía

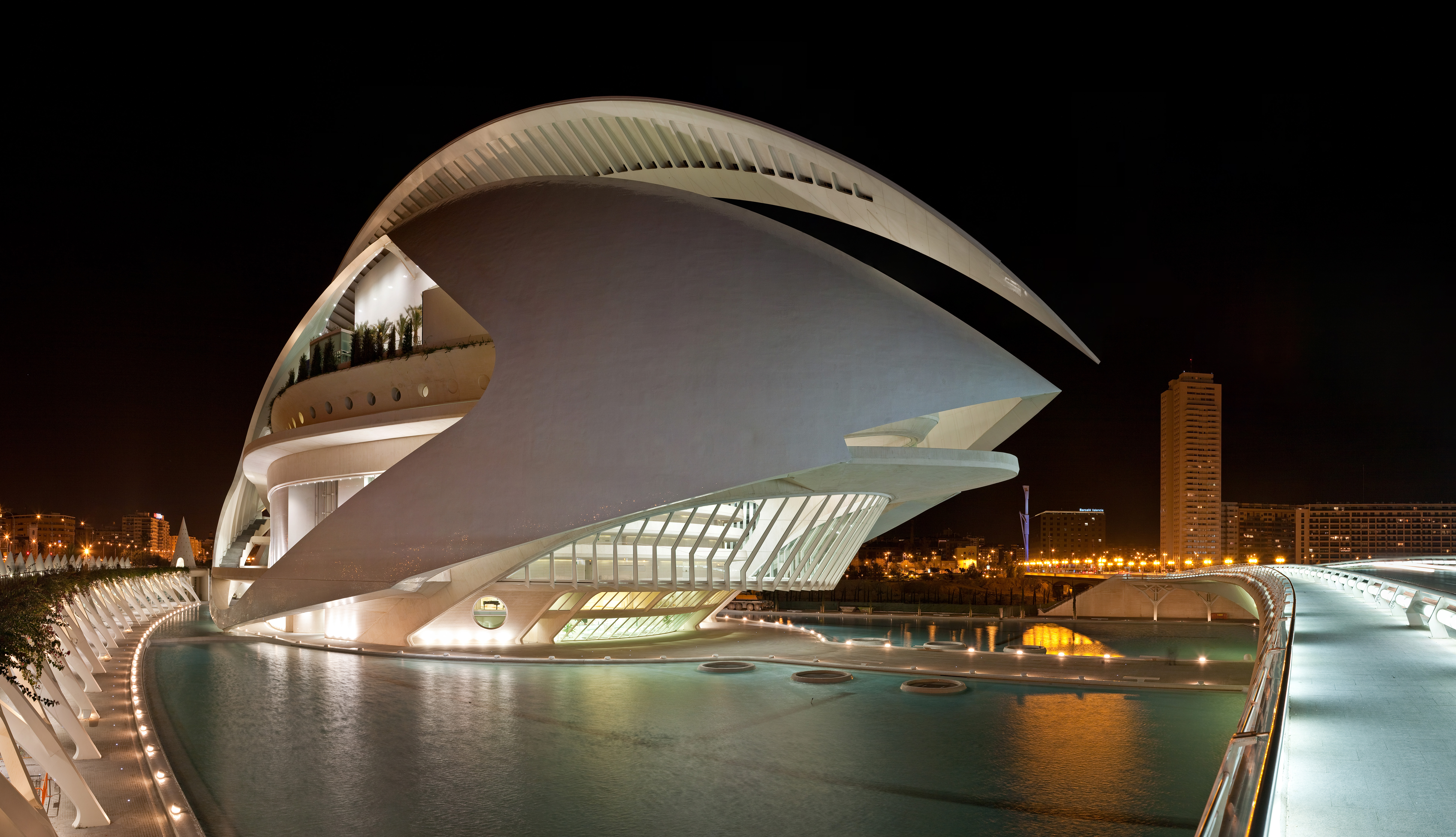
The Opera House at night

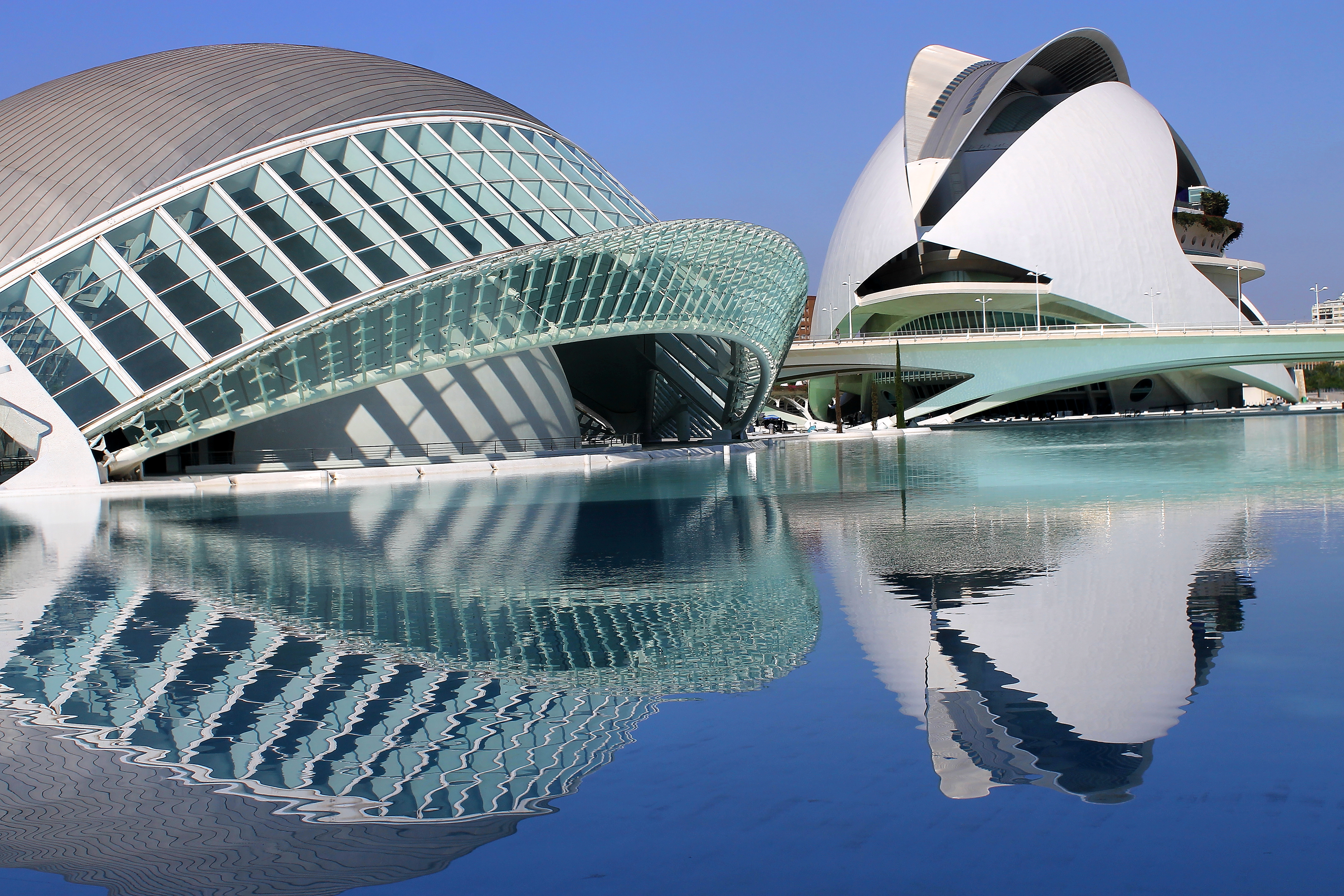
Reflections

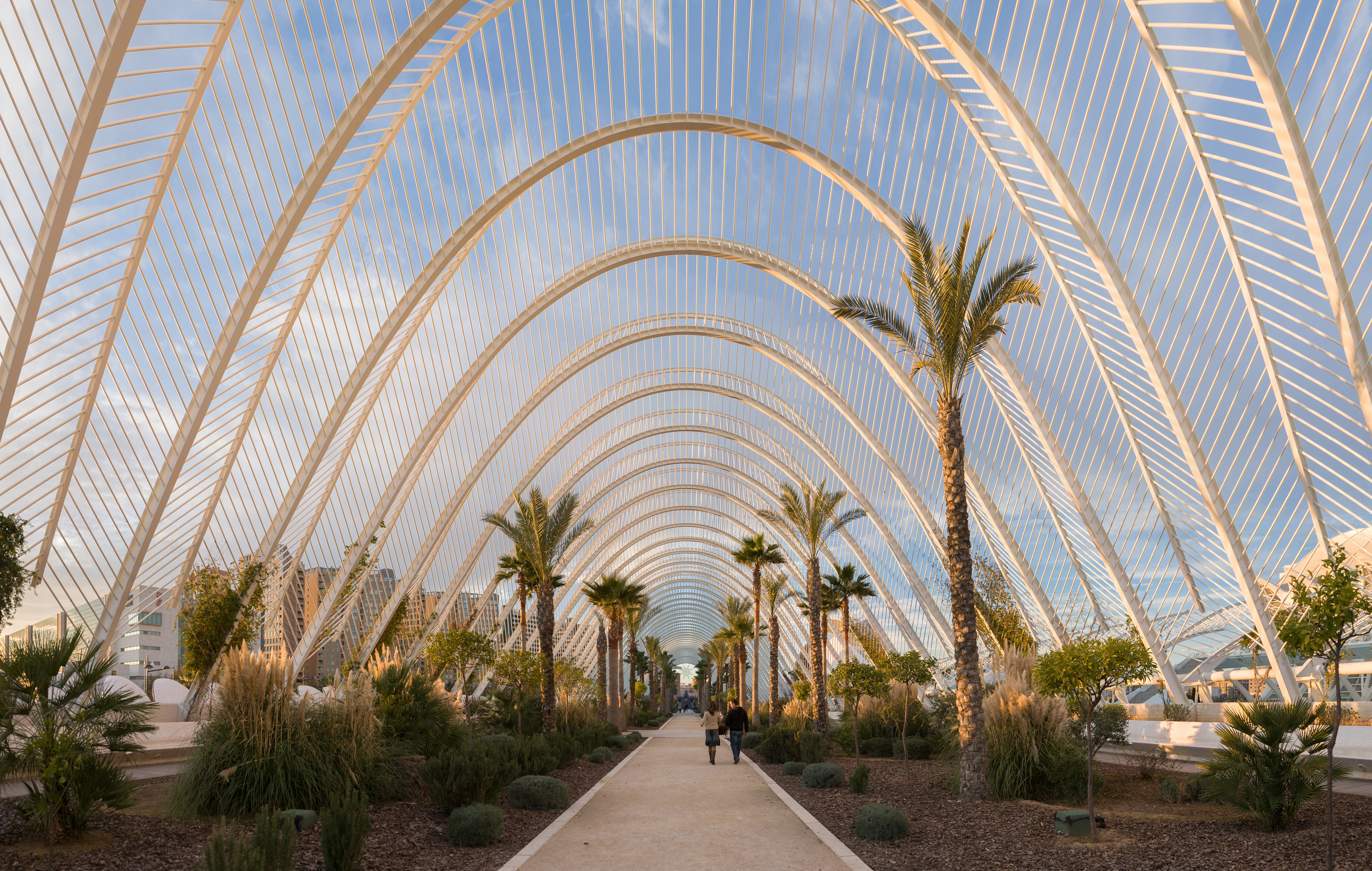
Interior of L'Umbracle (2007)

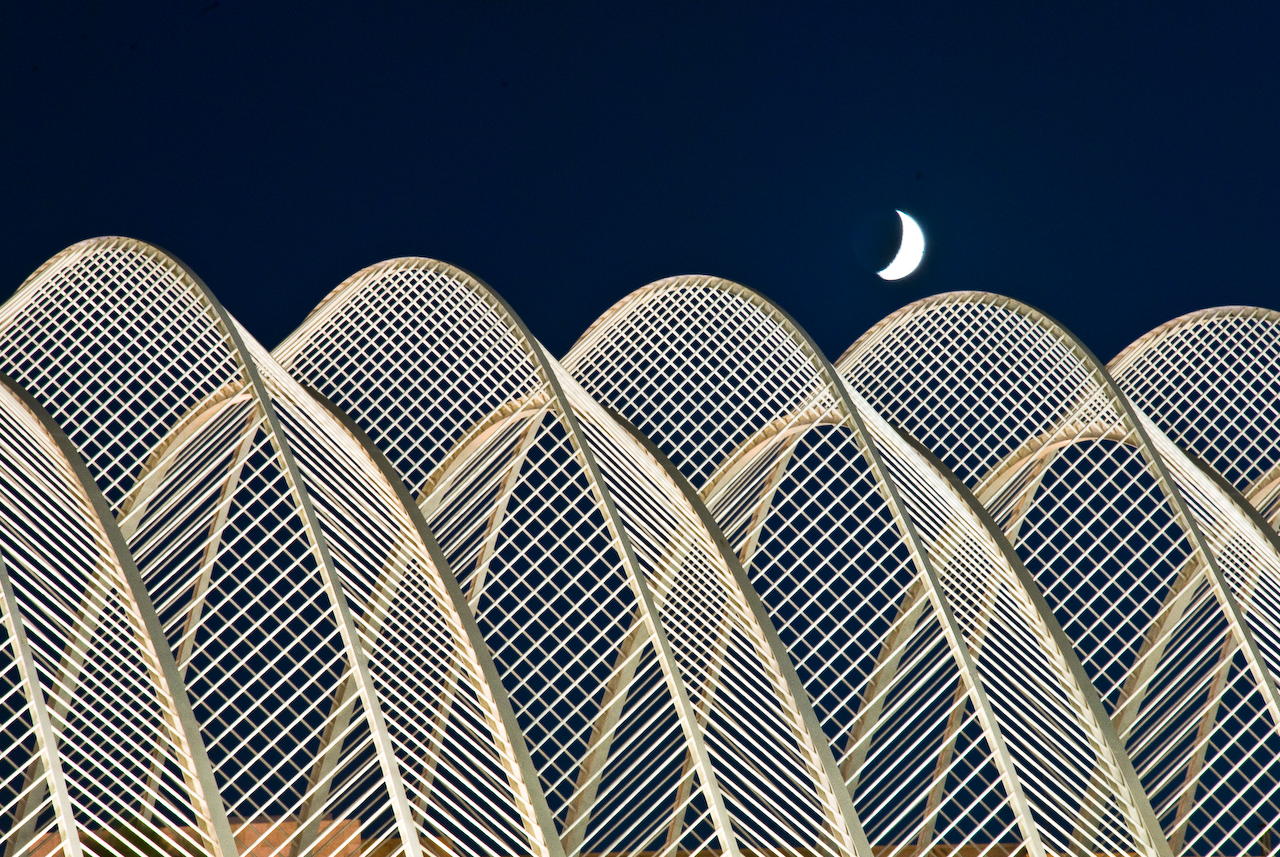
Walkway canopy of L'Umbracle

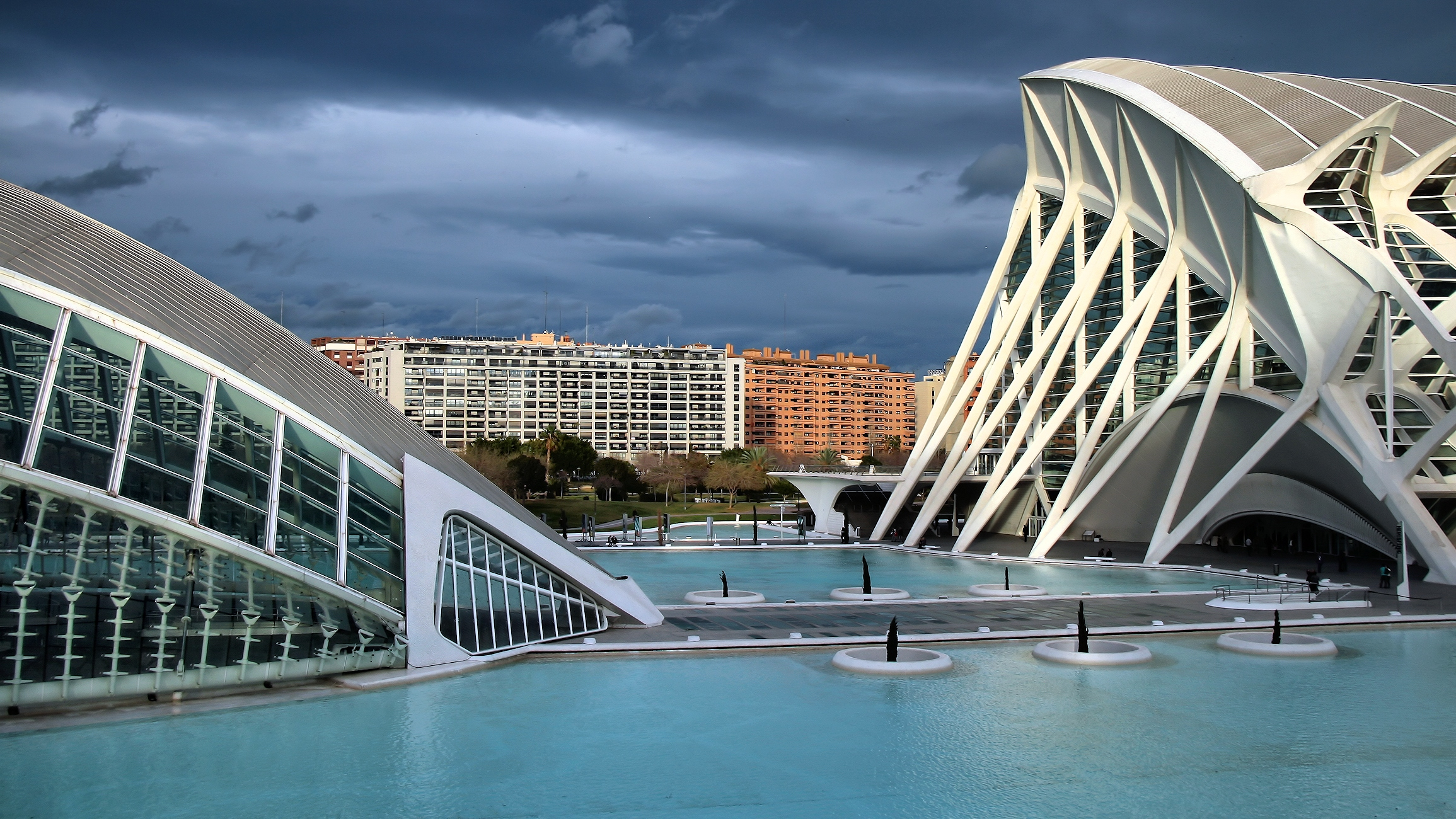
Panoramic

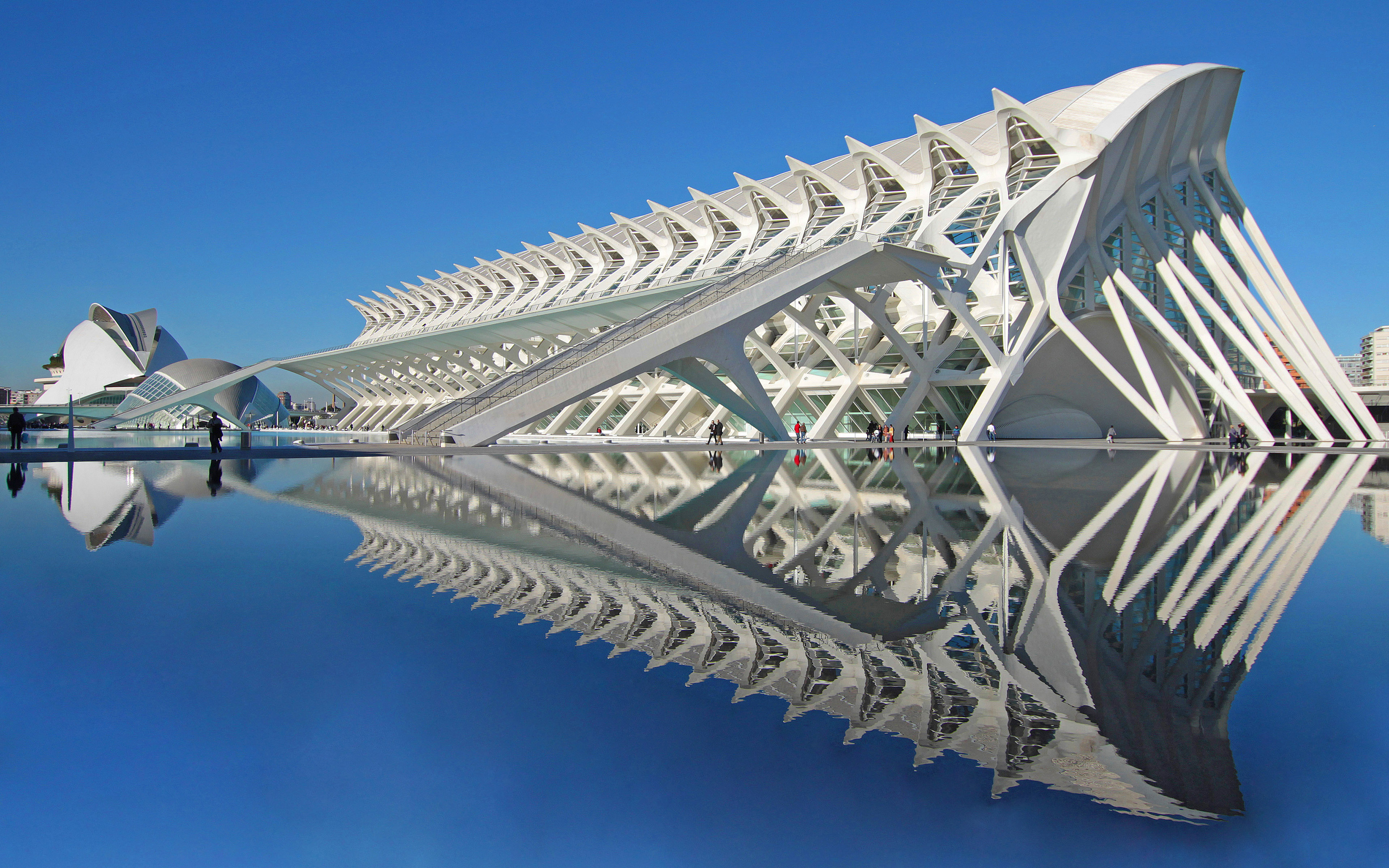
Museu de les Ciències Príncipe Felipe

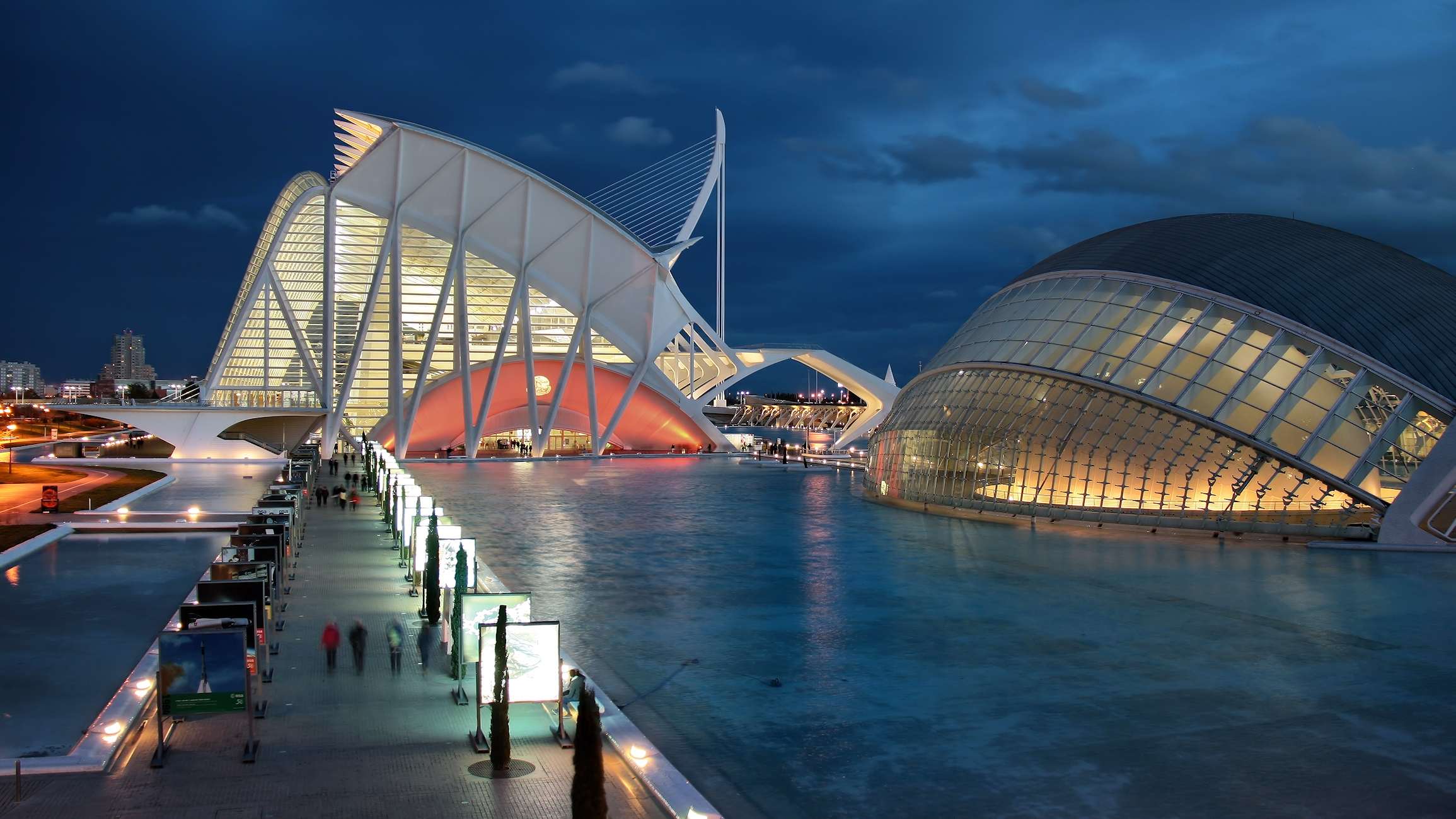
City of Arts and Sciences at night

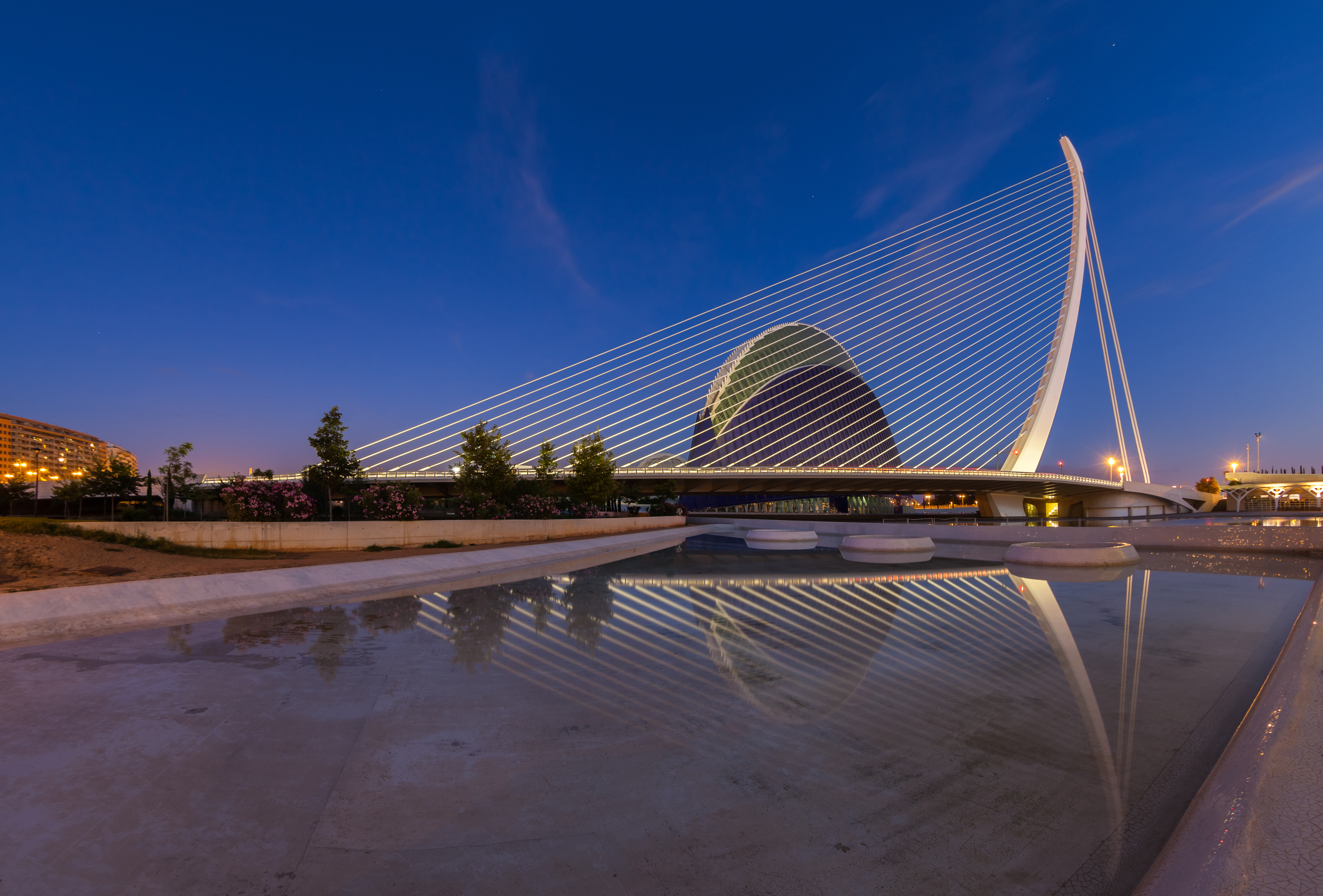
Assut de l'Or Bridge, Ágora (2014)

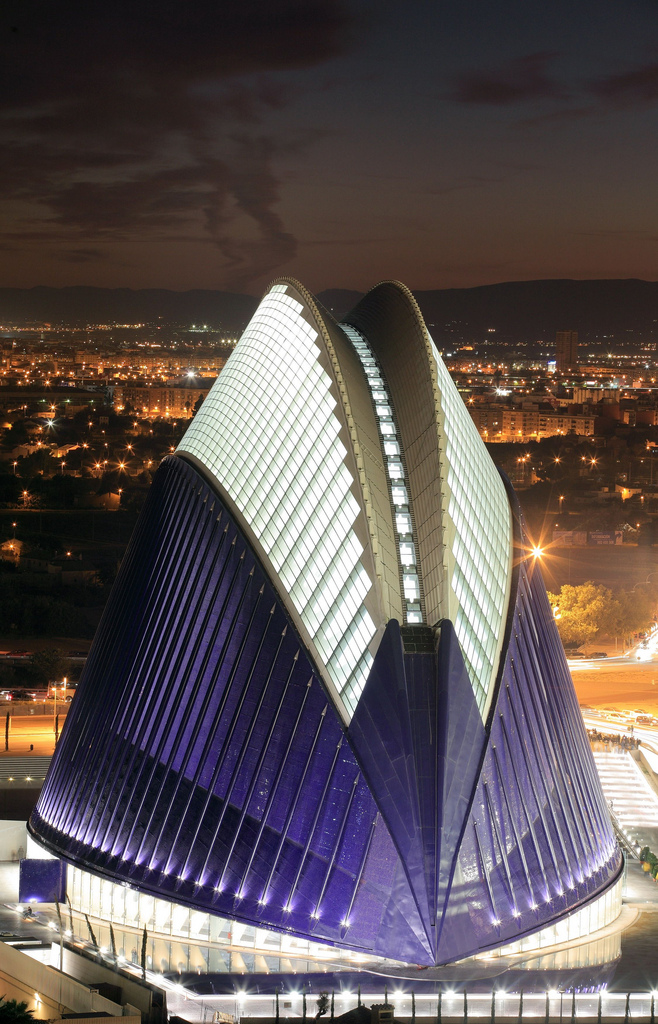
L'Àgora 2010

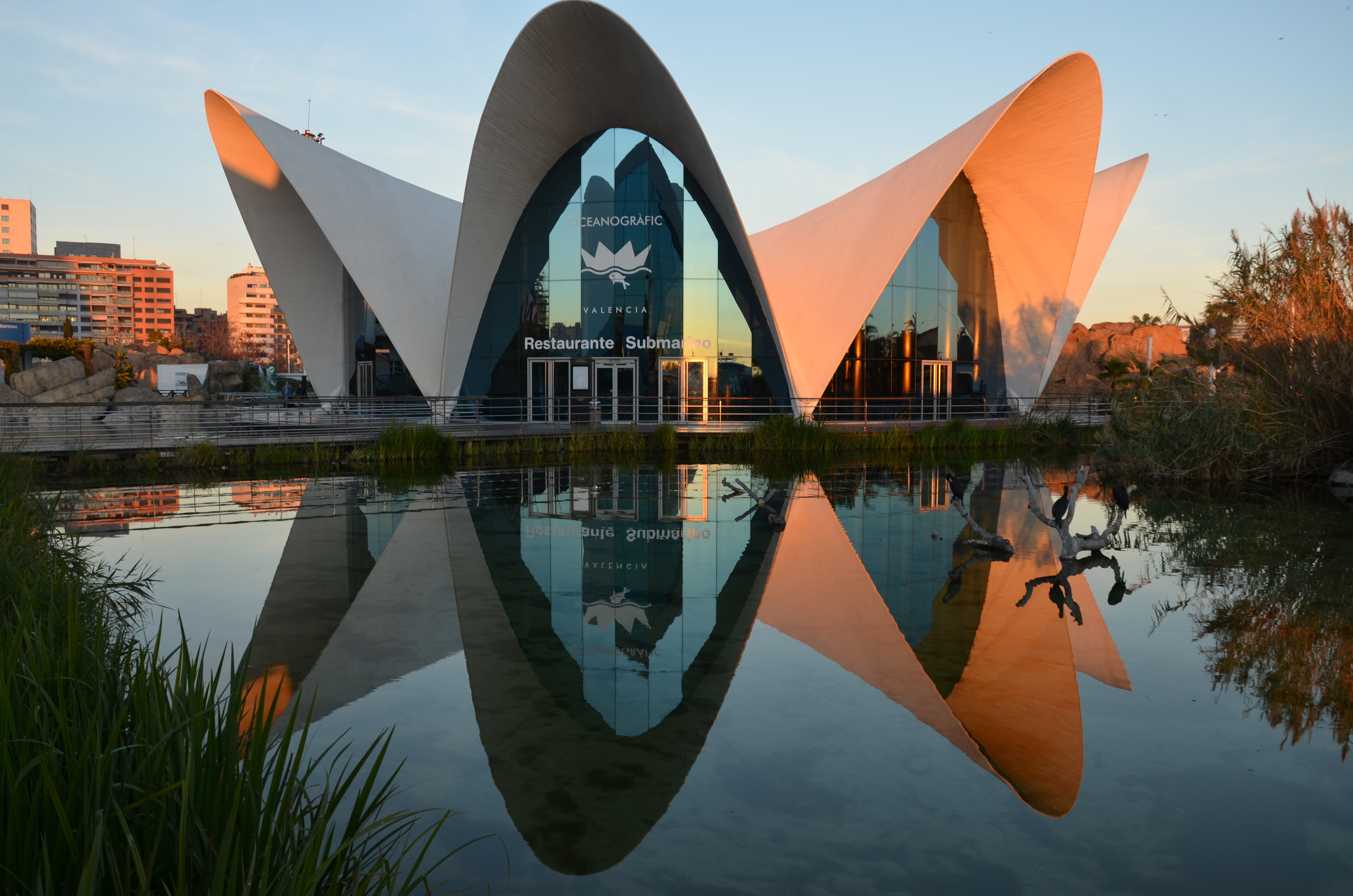
L'Oceanogràfic (2019)

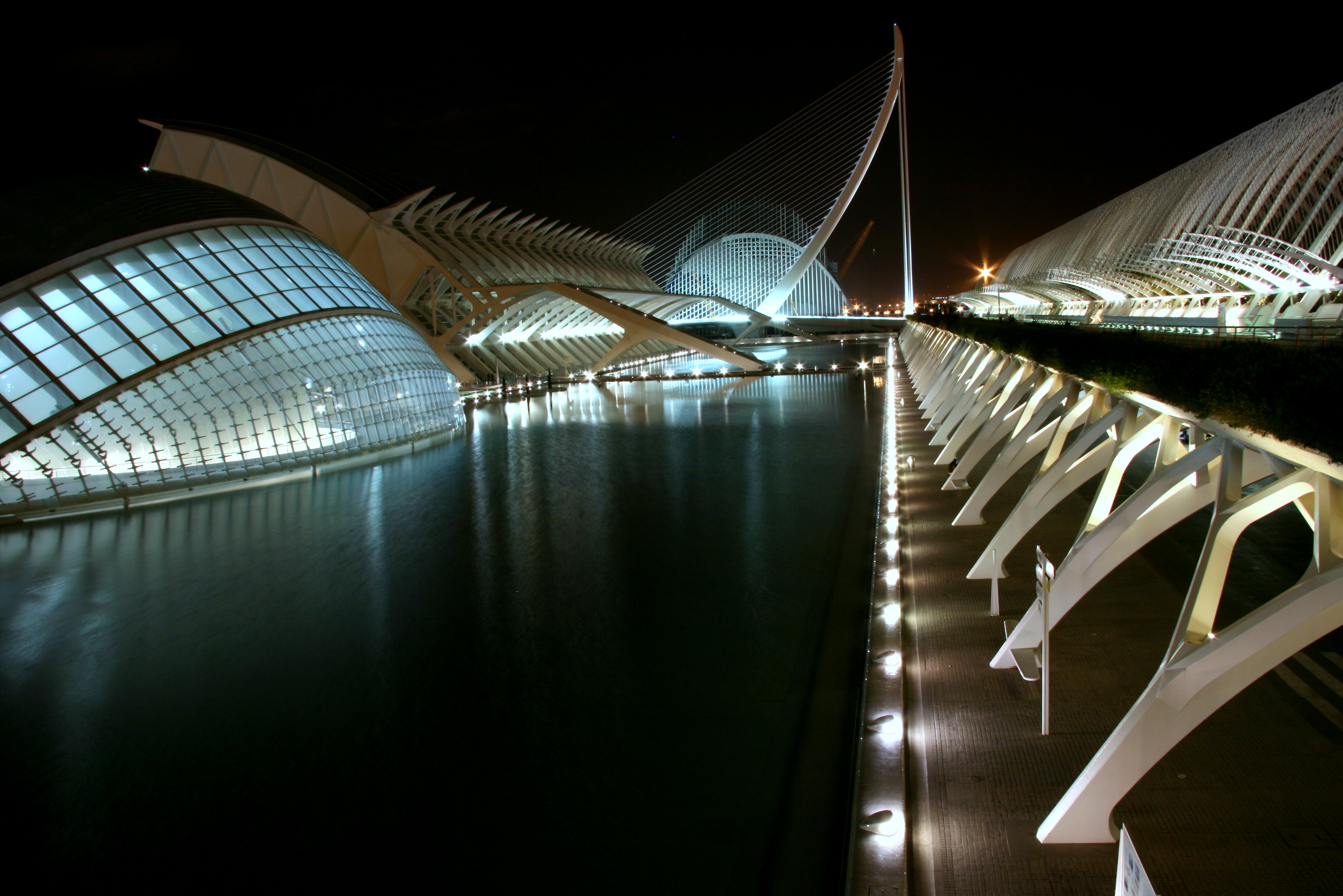
Noche Ciudad Artes Ciencias

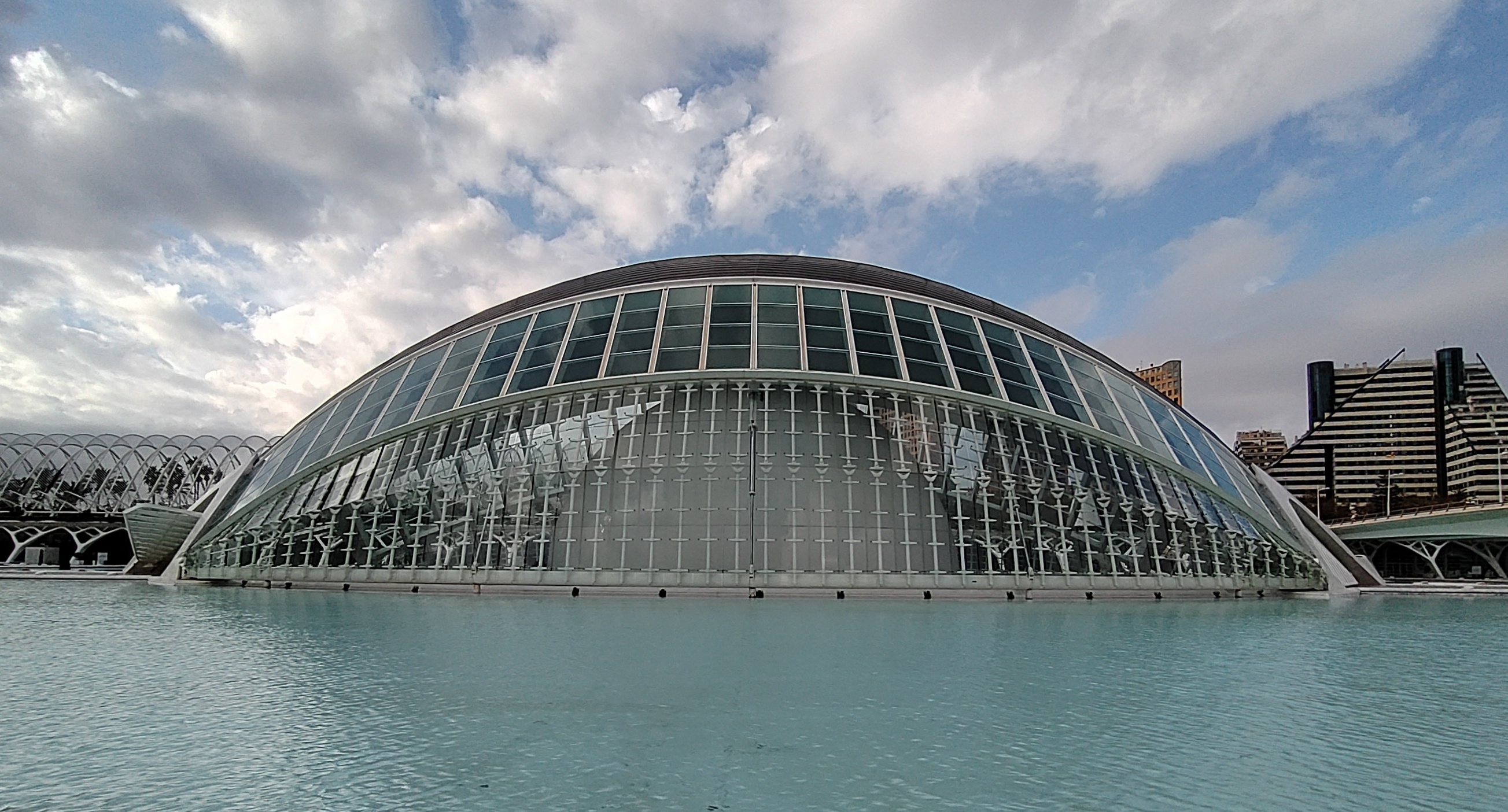
L'Hemisfèric in November 2024

== See also ==
- 12 Treasures of Spain
- Culture of Spain
- Tourism in Spain
- Quatre Carreres, home of the City of Arts and Sciences.
