= Montolivet Bridge =

Montolivet Bridge Pont de Montolivet (Valencian) Puente de Montolivete (Spanish)
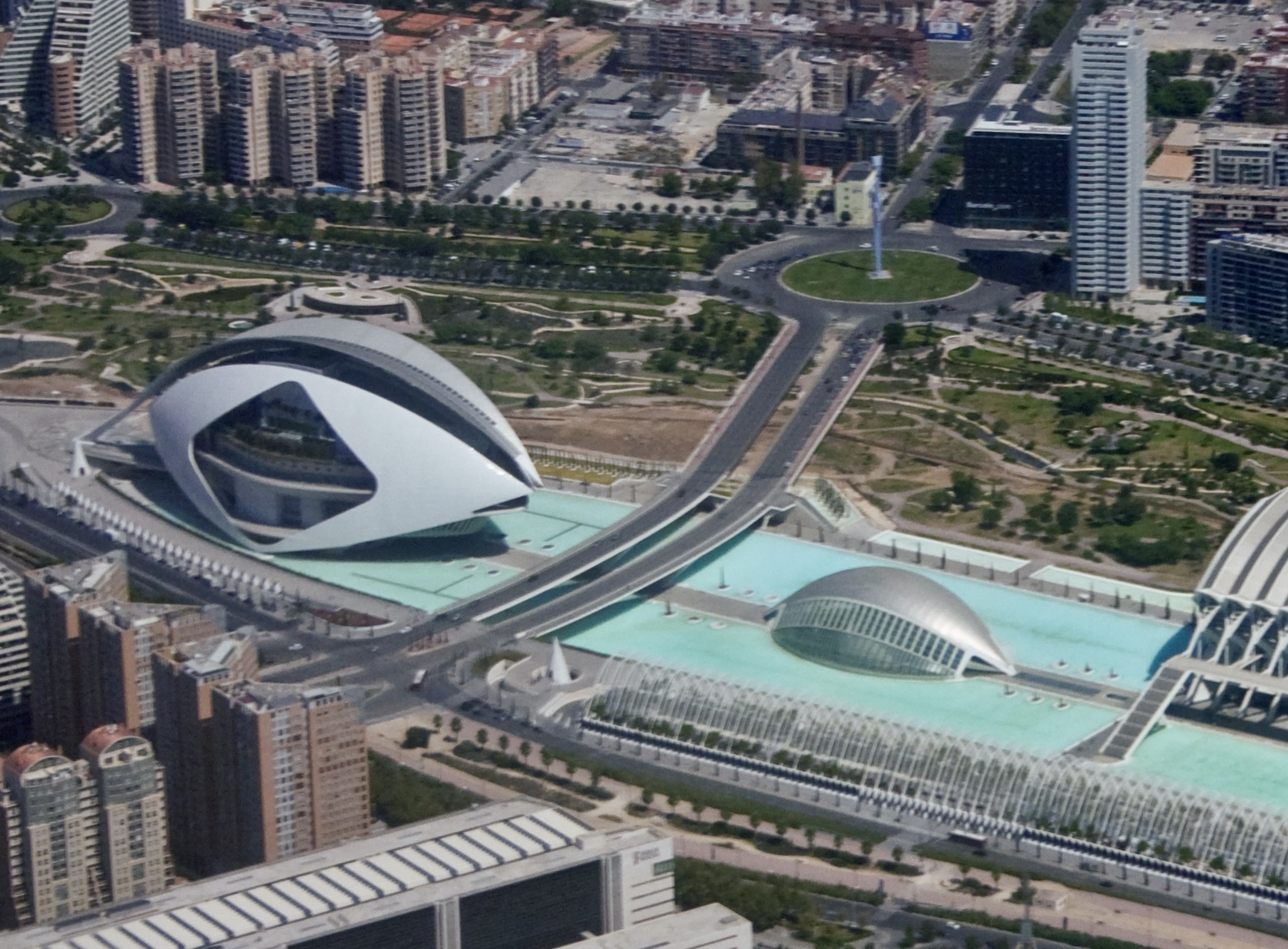
- Montolivet bridge connects the Roundabout of Europe (upper right) with the Saler highway (lower left)
- Coordinates: 39°28′N 0°21′W
- Crosses: Túria Gardens (former riverbed of Túria River)
- Locale: Valencia, Spain
- Official name: Pont de Montolivet
- Other name: Puente de Monteolivete

Characteristics
- Design: concrete road bridge
- No. of spans: two bridge segments joined together on the abutment in the middle of the Túria riverbed

History
- Designer: Fernández Ordóñez (north segment) Santiago Calatrava (south segment)
- Opened: opened to traffic 1999 though deemed deficient
- Inaugurated: 2007

Location
- Interactive map of Montolivet Bridge

The Montolivet Bridge (Valencian: Pont de Montolivet, Spanish: Puente de Monteolivete) (Note: Pronunciation, Valencian: [ˈpɔnd de montoliˈvet], Spanish: [ˈpwente ðe montoliˈβete].) is a road bridge in the southeast part of the city of Valencia that crosses the dry Túria riverbed and the western half of the City of Arts and Sciences. To the north, the bridge ends at the Roundabout of Europe, one of the largest in the city, while to the south it intersects the Saler motorway.

It is a unique bridge in the city because it consists of two clearly different bridge segments: the older straight bridge, which crosses only the northern half of the dry riverbed, and the newer curved bridge, which continues the bridge across an artificial reflecting pond to the southern shore. It was upon the construction of the City of Arts and Sciences in the riverbed that the south bridge segment was built. The two-segment bridge was inaugurated in 2007.

== Design features ==
Both bridge segments consist of two separate roadways, each with four lanes for vehicular traffic as well as a wide sidewalk for bicycles and pedestrians. The total width of the dual roadways including the median gap is about 41 m (135 ft) for both bridge segments.

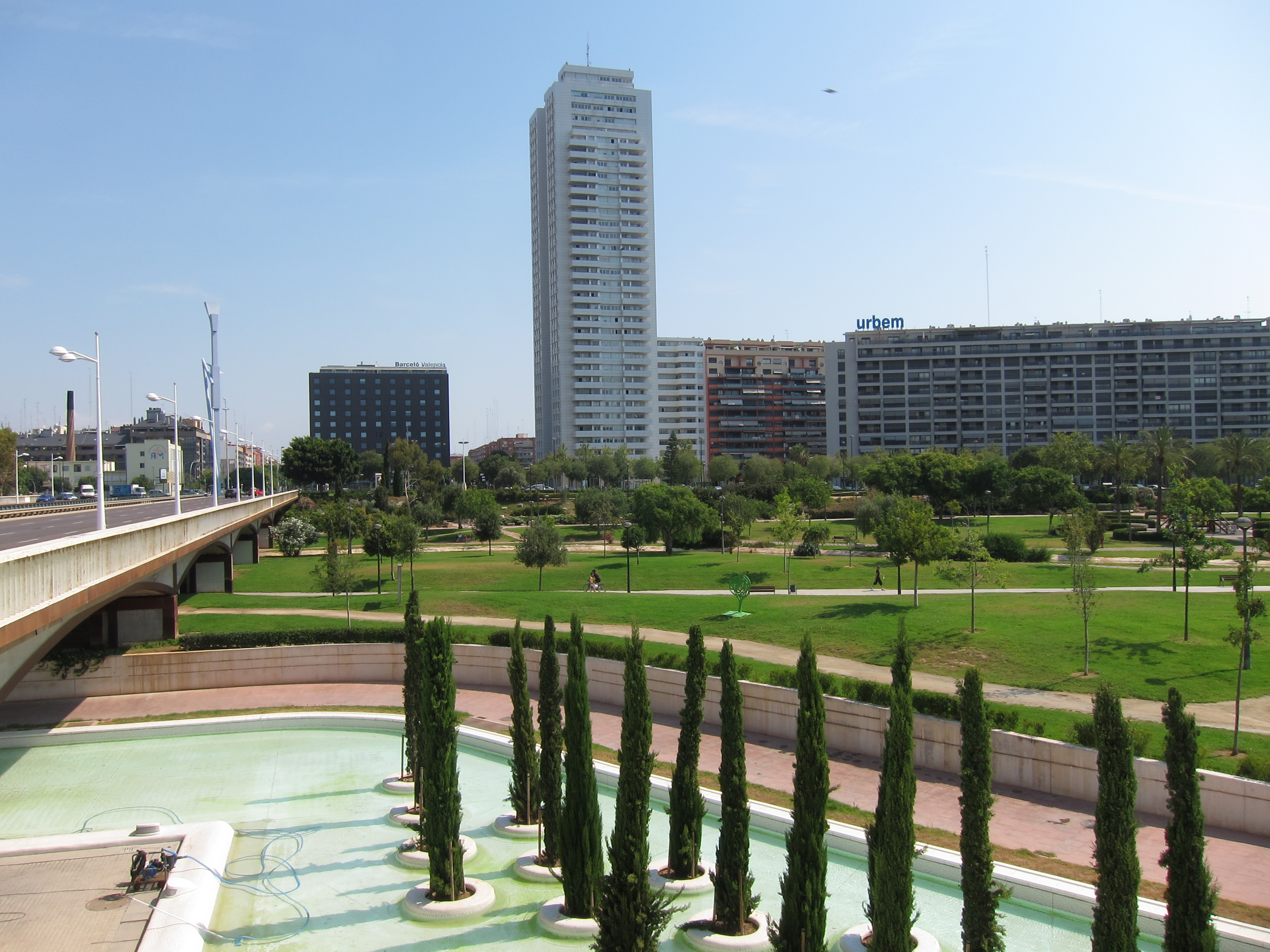
Montolivet bridge: straight segment (left) with distinctive brown accemt on gray concrete, looking north

The older north bridge segment, built in the 1980s, was designed by Fernández Ordóñez (1933–2000) with straight dual roadways and was also called the Maristas Brothers bridge. Each roadway is supported by a series of dual vertical rectangular columns, in between which are smooth haunches in gray concrete with the corners and other trim details painted distinctively in brown. In 2014, the railings of this older north segment was replaced.

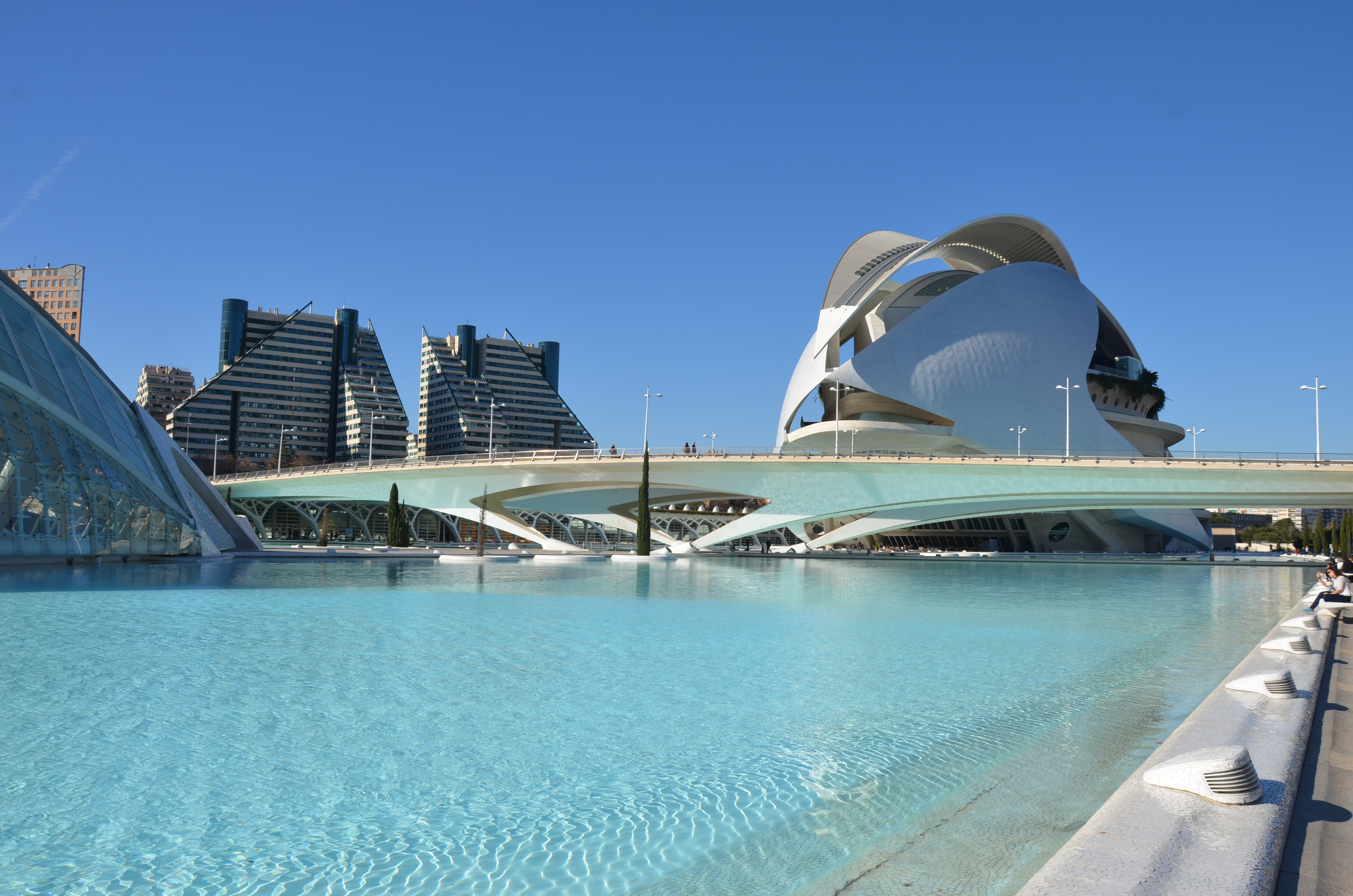
Montolivet bridge: southern segment with only two points of support per roadway, looking west

In contrast, the newer south bridge segment, designed by Santiago Calatrava, has two curved roadways each supported on four slender curved legs that converge at a point base midway across an artificial reflecting pond. Made of white shiny concrete, it contains hardly any straight line, mainly swooping curves, which give it an organic leaping quality when view on the riverbed level. It ties L'Hemisfèric to its east with Palua de les Arts Reina Sofía to its west. It plays a significant role in the whole scheme of the City of Arts and Sciences.

The two bridge segments are joined at the staircase abutment, which has stairs on each side leading down to the riverbed. On the median of the abutment, there is a round Roman limestone column 5.1 m (17 ft) high. It was a gift from the architect Calatrava to the city of Valencia, to mark the spot where Pope Benedict XVI conducted Mass on 9 July 2006.

== Gallery ==
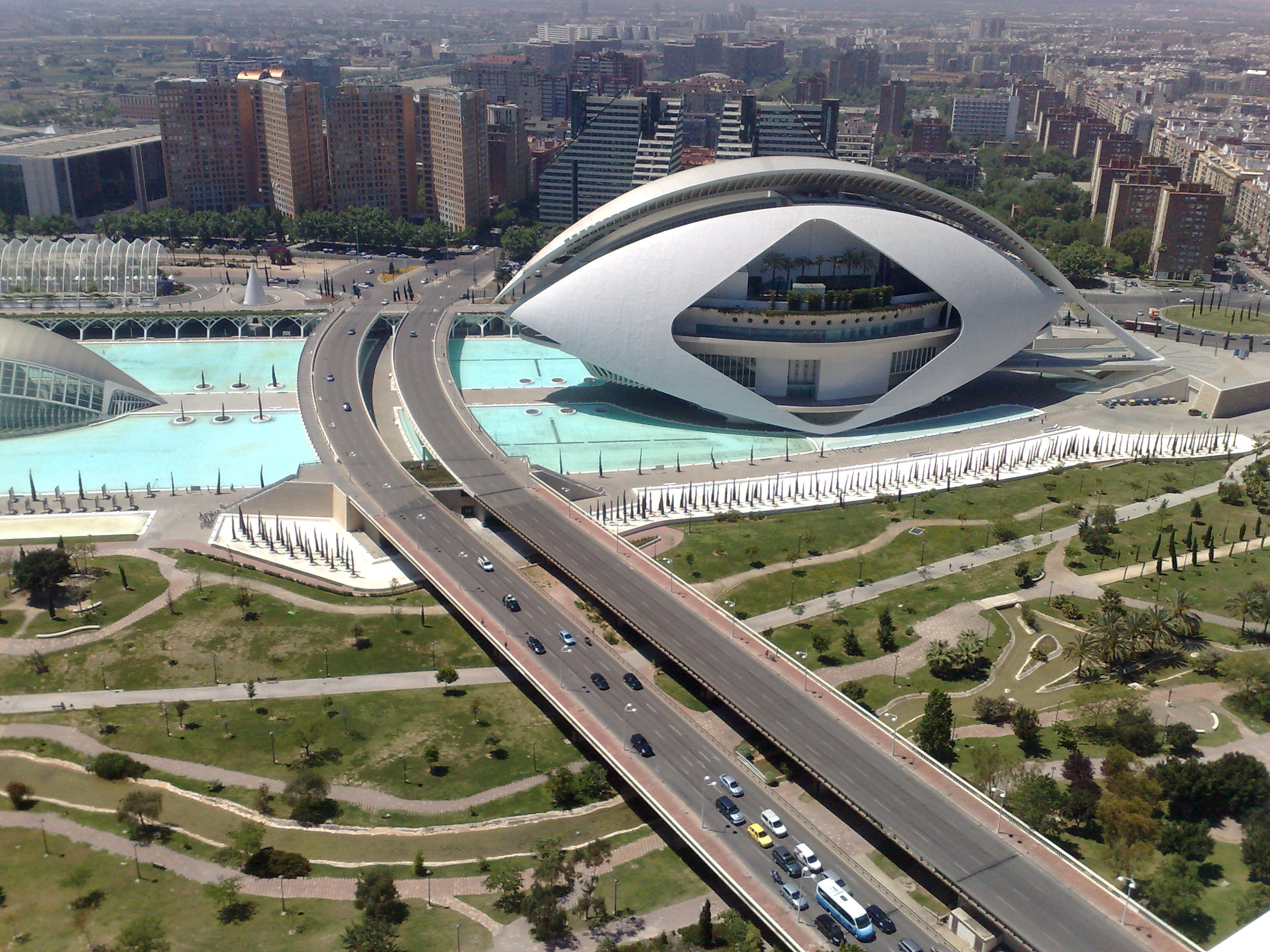
Aerial view of Montolivet Bridge, looking south

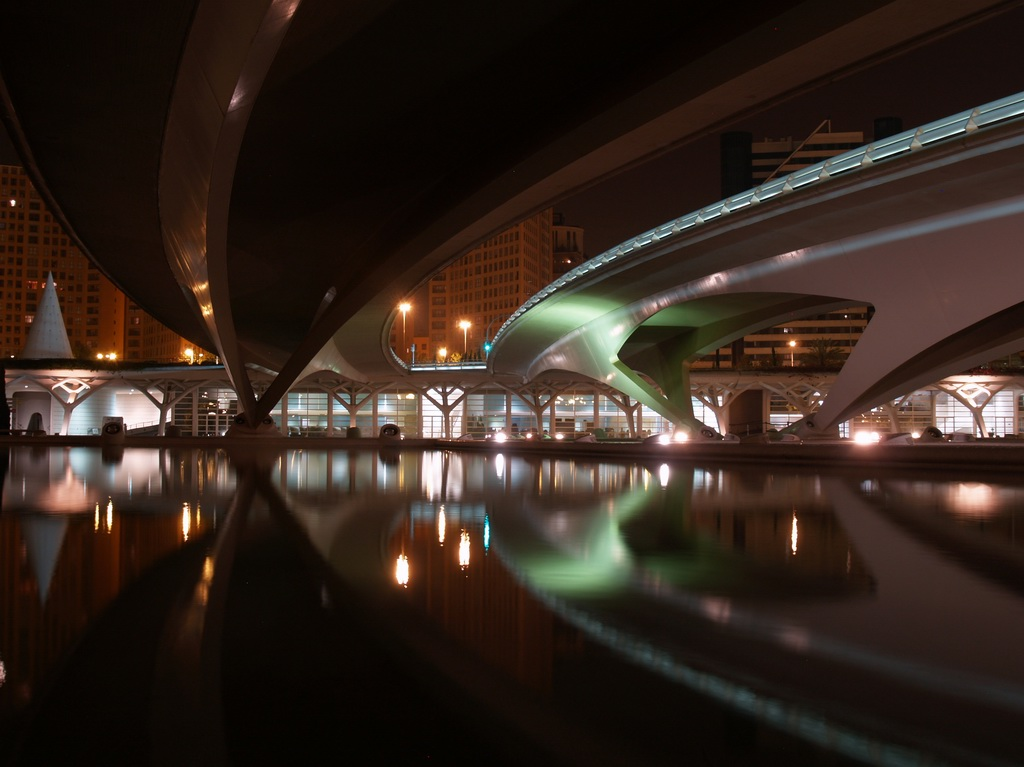
Riverbed view of Montolivet Bridge at night, looking south

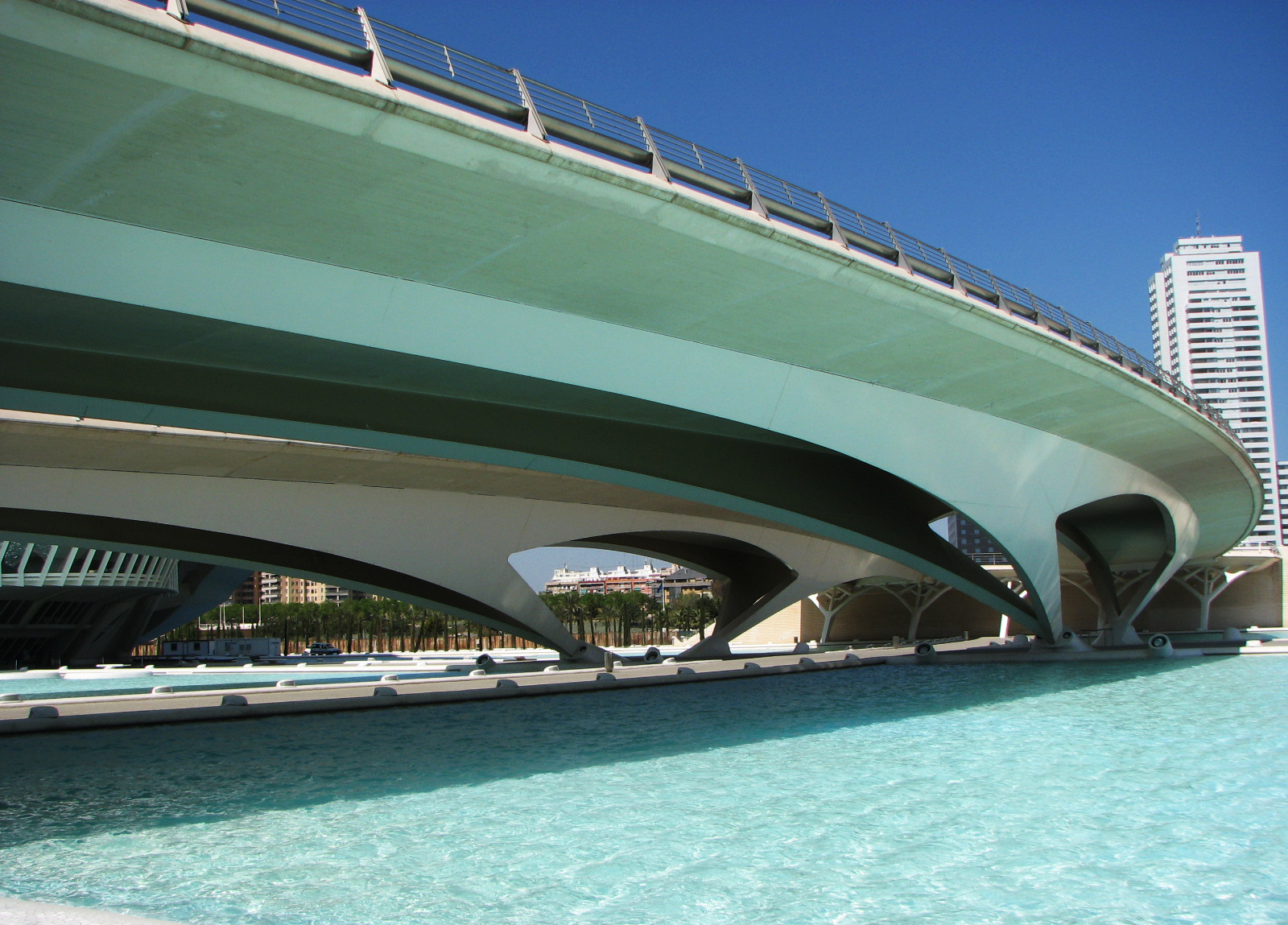
Montolivet Bridge, riverbed level looking north

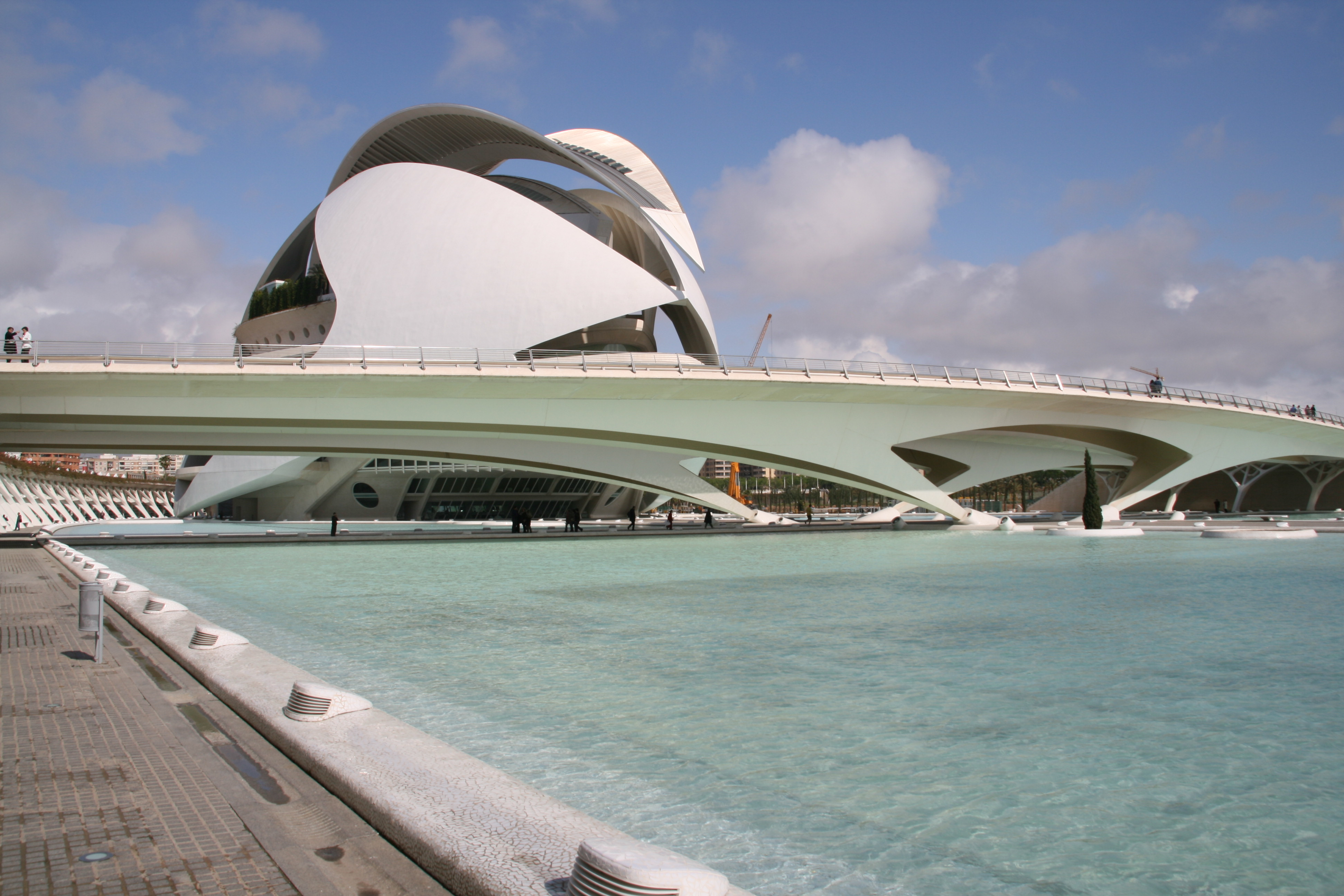
Riverbed view of Montolivet Bridge, looking northwest

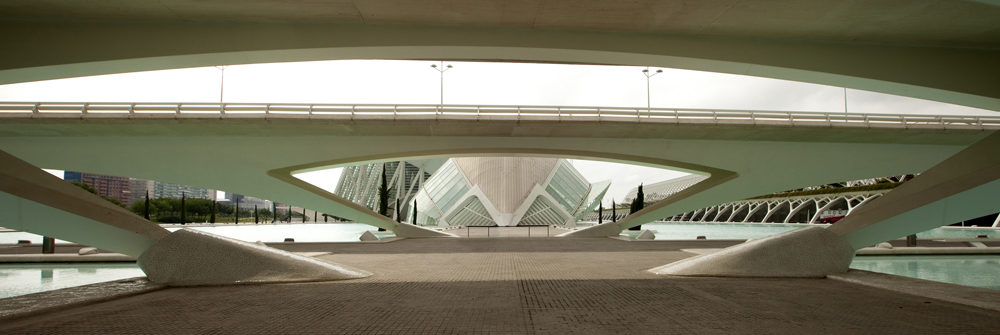
Riverbed level looking east under the west roadway of the Montolivet Bridge
