= L'Umbracle =

Sculpture garden in Valencia, Spain

Coordinates: 39°27′20″N 0°21′14″W

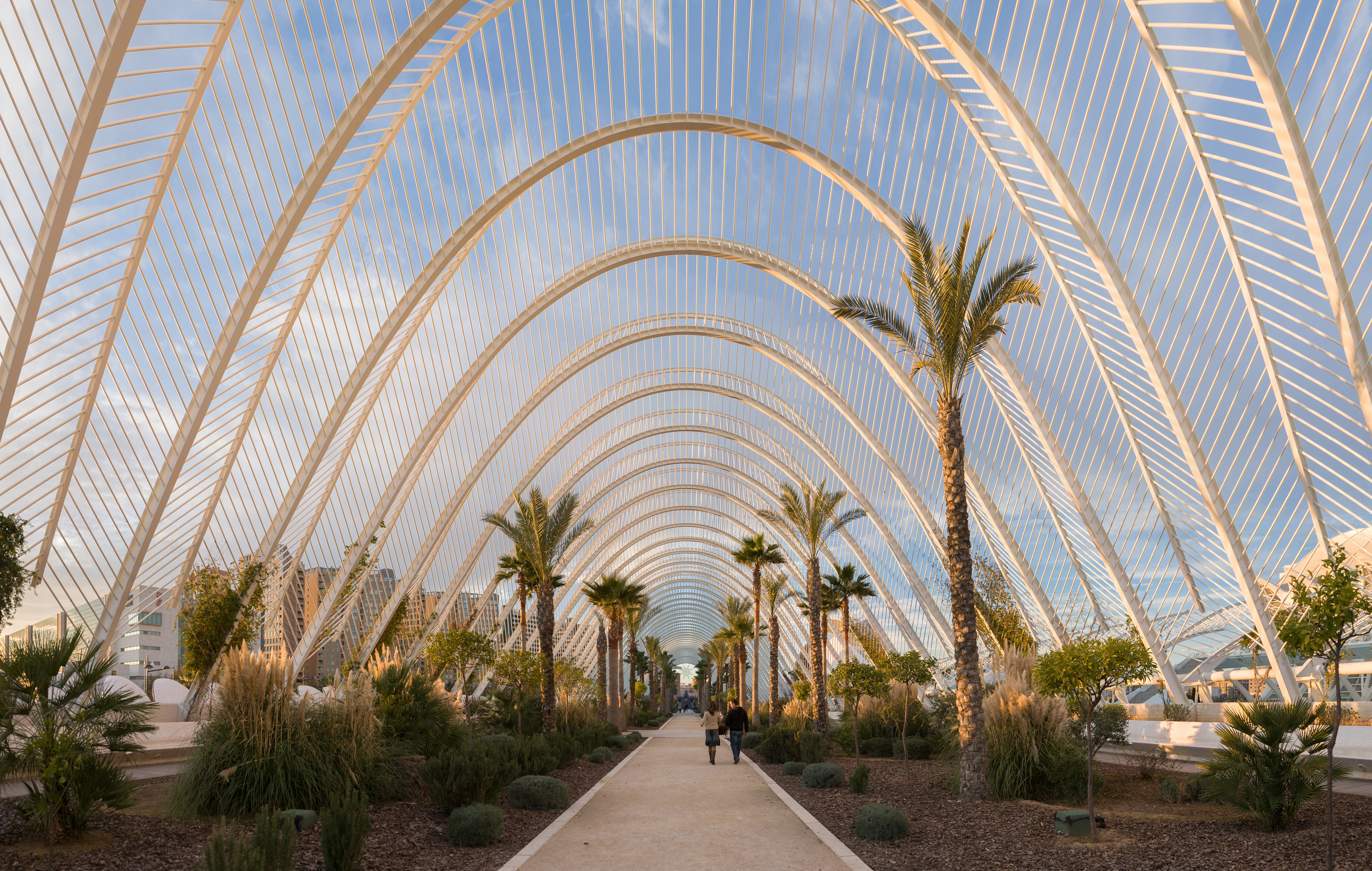
Looking along the interior of the structure (2007)

L'Umbracle (Valencian: [lumˈbɾakle]), part of the City of Arts and Sciences complex in Valencia, Spain, is a sculpture garden and landscaped walk with plant species indigenous to Valencia (such as rockrose, lentisca, rosemary, honeysuckle, bougainvillea and palm trees). It harbors in its interior The Walk of the Sculptures, an outdoor art gallery with sculptures from contemporary artists (Miquel of Navarre, Francesc Abbot, Yoko Ono and others). The Umbracle is a space that is a home to numerous sculptures surrounded by nature. It was designed by Santiago Calatrava as an entrance along the southwestern edge to the City of Arts and Sciences and as a cover over its car park. L'Umbracle was completed in 2001.

== Overview ==
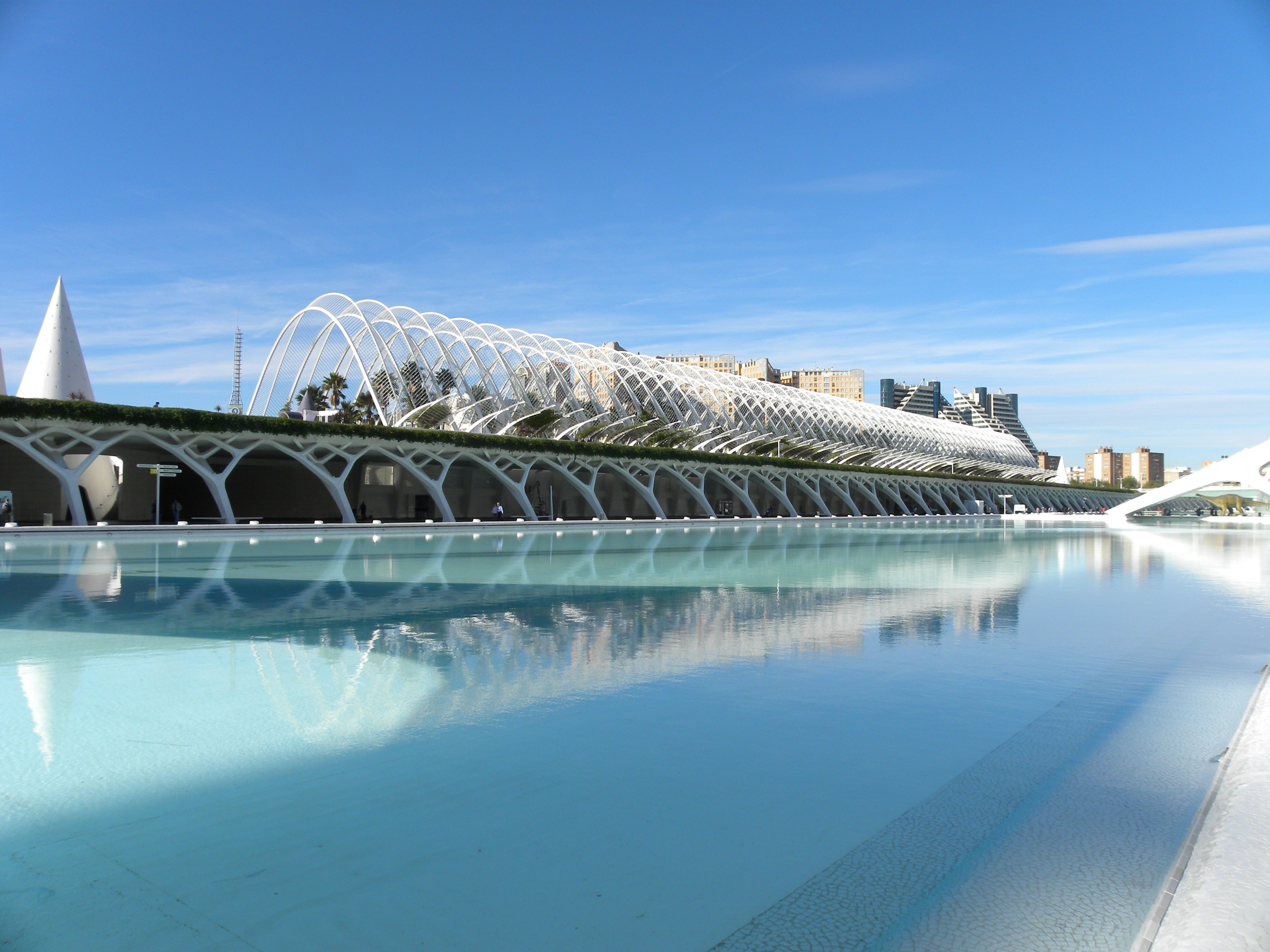
L'Umbracle covers a car park beneath it.

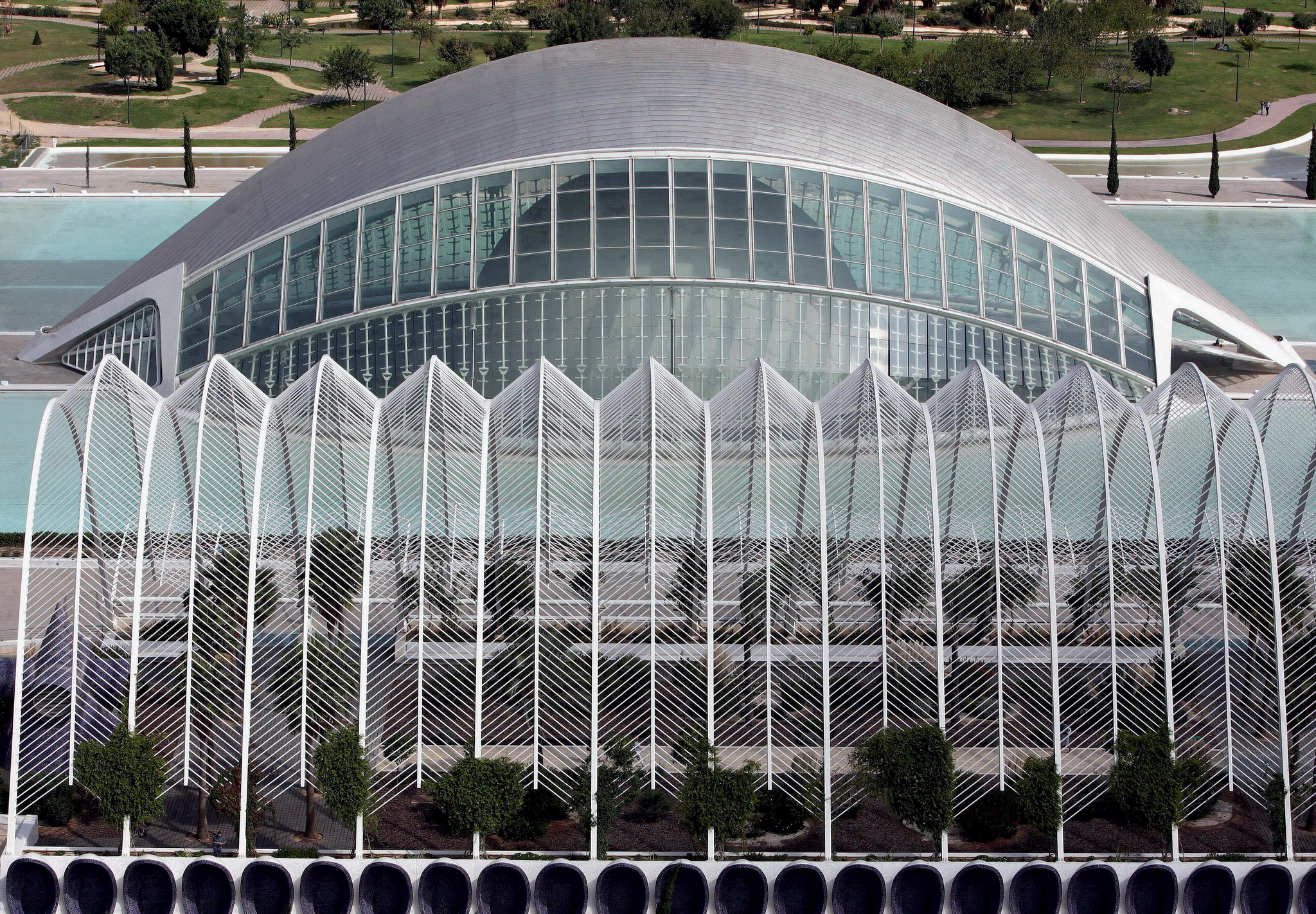
View of L'Umbracle with L'Hemisfèric behind it

It is 320 metres (1,050 ft) long and 60 metres (200 ft) wide, located on the southern side of the complex. It has 55 fixed arches and 54 floating arches that stand 18 metres (59 ft) high.

The arches are parabolic.

The plants in the garden were carefully picked to change colour with the seasons. The garden consists of 99 palm trees, 78 small palm trees, and 62 bitter orange trees. There are 42 varieties of shrubs from the Region of Valencia including cistuses, mastics, buddleia, pampas grass, and plumbagos. Honeysuckle and hanging bougainvillea are two of the 450 climbing plants in the Umbracle. It also has 5,500 ground cover plants such as lotus, Spanish flags, and fig-marigolds. There are over a hundred aromatic plants including rosemary and lavender.
