= The New York Times Capsule =

The New York Times Capsule (1999–2001) was created by Santiago Calatrava and sits in front of the American Museum of Natural History in New York City. The capsule contains more than 100 items and is scheduled to be opened in the year 3000.

== History ==
The capsule was funded by the New York Times who chose artist Santiago Calatrava to design the project. The capsule was cast in 1999 at the A.R.T. Research Enterprises foundry in Lancaster, PA at a cost of $60,000. The stainless steel piece weighs 2800 lbs an is approxomately 5' X 5' X 5'. The official dedication was on March, 26th 2000.

The editors of New York Times Magazine chose 48 artists to invite to submit proposals for a time capsule that would hold chosen items from this century to be opened in the year 3000.

10 finalists were chosen and their designs were put on display with items to be placed in the capsule during the Capturing Time: The New York Times Capsule exhibition at the museum.

When the exhibition closed on March 26, 2000 the capsule was shipped back to A.R.T. Design in Lancaster, PA so the chosen artifacts could be placed inside on March 28, 2001. The capsule was placed in its original location on April 26, 2001.

== Design ==
The capsule is 5' X 5' X 5', is made of stainless steel and weighs 2800 lbs. The design is meant to resemble a flower and opens into four quadrants that each store a portion of the 100+ items to be opened in the year 3,000 A.D.

== Location ==
The capsule was initially displayed in the museum as part of the lead up exhibition and was then sent back to the foundry in Lancaster, PA for final prep before its permanent installation.

The capsule was permanently installed by the 79th street entrance but was moved to the garden near the 81st street entrance to make room for the museum's construction of the new Richard Gilder Center.

The time capsule was temporarily removed from the NYC Natural History Museum in 2019, and stored in CT. It is scheduled to be returned to the Natural History Museum in 2026.

== See also ==
- The New York Times
- American Museum of Natural History
- Time capsule
