= Yitzchak Sheilat =

Israeli rabbi, librarian and translator (born 1946)

Rabbi Yitzchak Sheilat
- יצחק שילת
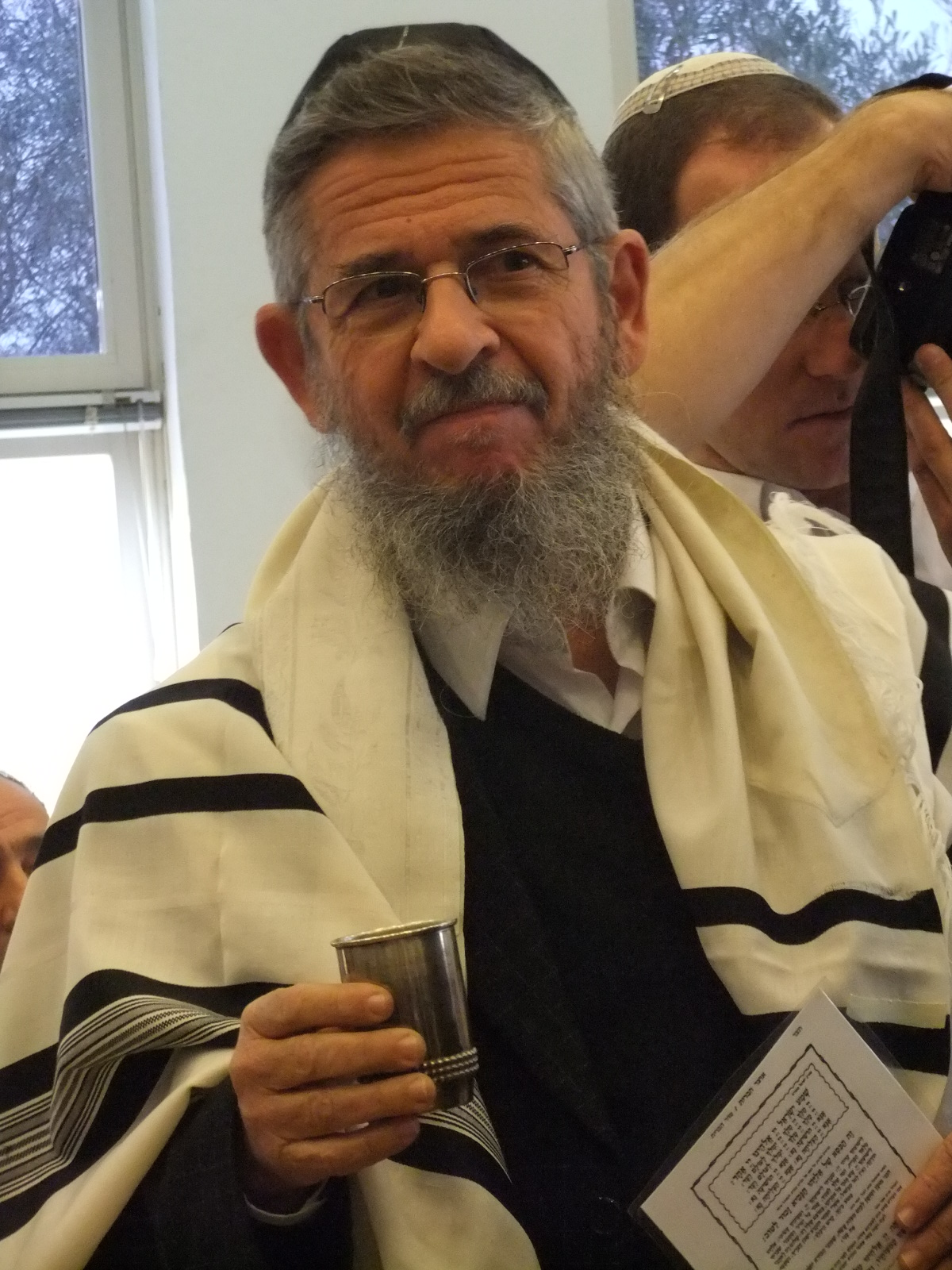
- Rabbi Yitzchak Sheilat in 2011

Co-founder of Yeshivat Birkat Moshe
- Incumbent
- Assumed office 1977

Rosh Yeshiva of Yeshivat Birkat Moshe
- Incumbent
- Assumed office 2016

Personal life
- Born: Yitzchak Grinshpan; 1946 (age 79–80) Jerusalem
- Education: Mercaz HaRav
- Occupation: Rabbi, scholar, librarian, translator

Religious life
- Religion: Judaism
- Denomination: Orthodox

Rabbi Yitzchak Sheilat (Hebrew: יצחק שילת; born Yitzchak Grinshpan; 1946) is an Israeli Orthodox rabbi and scholar of Jewish thought, specializing in the writings of Maimonides and Rabbi Abraham Isaac Kook. He co-founded and serves as a senior faculty member at Yeshivat Birkat Moshe, the Hesder yeshiva of Maale Adumim.

== Biography ==
Sheilat was born in Jerusalem in 1946. The majority of his studies took place at Yeshivat Mercaz HaRav, where he studied under rabbis Tzvi Yehuda Kook and David Cohen.

He is a close disciple of Kook and studied privately with him for several years, learning the Halakhic and philosophical writings of Kook's father, Rabbi Abraham Isaac Kook. "His influence on me as an educator and teacher was tremendous. We learned from his lectures, from his conduct, from the stories he told. He had a decisive influence on the yeshiva students."

He studied natural sciences at the Hebrew University in Jerusalem. Tzvi Yehuda Kook's policy, however, was not to allow students to combine yeshiva studies with academic studies; so Sheilat transferred to Yeshivat HaKotel. After completing his degree, he returned to Mercaz HaRav.

In 1977 he co-founded Yeshivat Birkat Moshe in Ma'aleh Adumim, near Jerusalem, with Rabbi Haim Sabato.

During the years when he taught at the yeshiva, he refused to be paid for teaching Torah, following Maimonides' teaching that accepting wages belittles the respect of Torah scholars. Instead, he took a salary as a librarian, working in the library for several hours a day. In 2016, when Rabbi Nahum Rabinovitch stepped down as rosh yeshiva and asked Sheilat to head the yeshiva, he left his librarian position and began receiving a salary as dean of the yeshiva.

Sheilat is also a disciple of Rabbi Gedaliah Nadel, a prominent student of the Chazon Ish. After Nadel's death in 2004, Sheilat published a compilation of his teachings entitled Betorato shel Rav Gedalia. Sheilat wrote in the preface that everything in the book was approved by Nadel himself. The book, however, was banned by three of the most respected spiritual leaders in the Haredi world, as it seeks to resolve apparent contradictions between science and Torah, accepting Charles Darwin's theory of evolution and other scientific views over biblical literalism.

In 2012 he was awarded the Rav Kook Prize from the Tel Aviv–Jaffa Municipality for his work on texts of Maimonides.

His wife, Yehudit Sheilat, is the director of Takana, a forum of prominent personalities fighting sexual abuse in the National Religious sector. They have 9 children.

== Views ==
Sheilat said that it is important that Jews visit Har HaBayit (the Temple Mount) in purity.

He said that religious soldiers ordered to evacuate settlements may not disobey orders.

He believes that Maimonides' gravesite in Tiberias is authentic. "The Rambam asked to be buried in Tiberias because of his belief that the Sanhedrin would be re-established there."

In 2018, Shilat published a book promoting his legal solution to the problems of Agunah and Get refusal by way of a new regulation (takanah). He said that the Rabbinical High Court in Israel is for all intents and purposes a "state court", since all marriages and divorces are subject to the authority of the Chief Rabbinate. Imposing a Get (divorce document) by force of the regulation will be completely kosher, and it will be considered a duly enacted divorce.

== Published works ==
Sheilat authored definitive editions of the following writings of Maimonides:

- Iggrot ha-Rambam
- Hakdamot ha-Rambam
- Avot im Perush ha-Rambam

In 2009, he authored a new translation of Rabbi Judah Halevi's classic philosophical work, entitled: Sefer Ha-Kuzari: Precise Hebrew Translation in the Style of the Period of Its Composition. He wrote Bein ha-Kuzari le-Rambam in 2010, comparing the philosophical approaches of Maimonides and Rabbi Judah Halevi.

He published Zichron Teruah, Rosh Devarcha and Hararim Hateluyim, an analysis of practical halachic concepts in Tractates Rosh Hashanah, Berakhot and Shabbat.
