= Bab al-Shams =

Palestinian encampment in the West Bank

Coordinates: 31°48′4.00″N 35°16′54.00″E

Bab al-Shams (Arabic: باب الشمس Bāb aš-Šams: Gate of the Sun) was a Palestinian encampment in the West Bank that housed 250 Palestinian and foreign activists for two nights. On 10 January 2013, the group erected 25 tents on private Palestinian land (classified by Israel as state-owned E1 area), in protest of Israeli Prime Minister Benjamin Netanyahu's decision to build more than 3500 housing units there.

The Israeli government intended to remove the tent outpost, claiming that it was illegal, but the activists received a temporary injunction from the Supreme Court of Israel prohibiting the government from doing so for 6 days. However on 12 January, only 48 hours after the camp had been established, the occupants were evicted by the Israeli army. An Israeli police spokesman said the court allowed for the removal of the protesters even if the tents would stay temporarily. 100 people were arrested. On 16 January, the Palestinian Authority announced their decision to create a formal village council for Bab al-Shams. Later that day, the court rescinded the temporary injunction, and Israeli security forces bulldozed the tents that night.

== Reactions ==
Responding to the eviction of the site by Israeli police, the UN secretary General Ban Ki-moon, noted that the protestors had been "largely non-violent", adding that the right to stage peaceful protest should be "fully respected". Ban re-iterated his position that Israel should scrap its plans for development in the E1 area stating that Israeli settlements in the West Bank are illegal under international law and that "any such settlement plans for E1 must be rescinded".

After ordering the evacuation of the site, despite an Israeli Supreme court injunction against its demolition, the Israeli prime minister, Benjamin Netanyahu, stated "We will not allow anyone to harm the contiguity between Jerusalem and Ma'ale Adumim". Palestinian leaders also commented on the event.

Majid Suweilim, professor of political science at Al Quds University described Bab al Shams as "a direct challenge to the shift of Israeli policy towards the extreme right". He said that the message from the activists was that discussion over negotiations and international pressure had failed and that on the ground there should be a shift towards "democratic, resilient, peaceful popular resistance".

Some commenters compared the protest tactic to Israeli settlements. A Time report on the event noted the contrast between the "unusual briskness" with which the Palestinian site was evacuated and the Israeli settlement outposts of which there are around 100 and, although illegal under Israeli law, are supplied with utilities by the Israeli government and protected by the Israeli army: "In the lexicon of a conflict that is fundamentally over land, the camps are called 'outposts,' a term Israelis use to differentiate these more spontaneous efforts from the state-sanctioned 'settlements' that look more like suburban subdivisions."

== Name ==
The name of the village is inspired by the novel Bab Al-Shams, published in English as Gate of the Sun, by the Lebanese writer Elias Khoury who supported the idea.

== Culture ==
Palestinian Israeli singer Tamer Nafar wrote and sang a song about Bab al-Shams.
