= Yeshivat Birkat Moshe =

Coordinates: 31.790801°N 35.301476°E

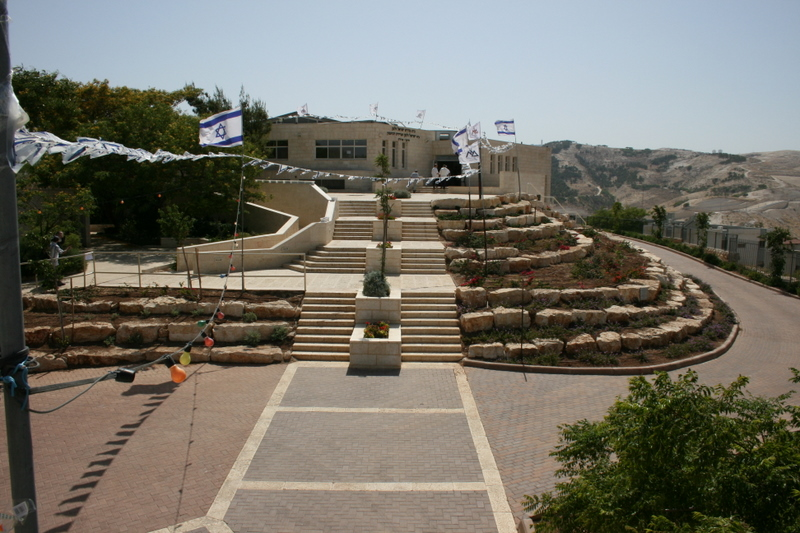
Yeshivat Birkat Moshe in Ma'ale Adumim

Yeshivat Birkat Moshe is a hesder yeshiva located in the Mitzpeh Nevo neighborhood of the Israeli settlement, Ma'ale Adumim. It was founded in 1977 by Haim Sabato and Yitzchak Sheilat, then two young rabbis from Yeshivat HaKotel, in Jerusalem.

For the first nine years since its inception it was situated in temporary structures the Maale Adumim's industrial zone Mishor Adumim, before moving to its current campus and location in Mitzpeh Nevo. Due to the founder rabbis' young age at the time, they refused the title rosh yeshiva and in 1983, they were joined by Nahum Rabinovich, who acted as the rosh yeshiva until his death in 2020.

The yeshiva has a wide range of students due to its wide range of rabbis from within the Religious Zionist community and its wide curriculum in Jewish studies: Tanakh and philosophy as well as Gemara.

Today the Yeshiva has approximately 300 students and 2,000 alumni.
