= Stop the Settlements Act =

- Long title: To provide for the imposition of sanctions with respect to settlements in the West Bank and Gaza, and for other purposes

Legislative history
- Introduced in the House of Representatives by Joaquin Castro on October 1, 2026

The Stop the Settlements Act is a proposed 2026 Act of Congress to impose sanctions on entities and individuals building or expanding settlements in the occupied West Bank and Gaza. The Act would also prohibit the import of goods made in the settlements.

== Background ==
Since 2022, the Israeli government has approved over 100 new settlements in the West Bank, and Israeli settlers have established nearly 200 additional settlements.

== Legislative history ==
The Act is planned to be introduced in the House of Representatives on October 1, 2026 by Representatives Joaquin Castro, Madeleine Dean, Don Beyer, Greg Casar, Sara Jacobs, and Veronica Escobar. Over 30 other House Democrats have signed on as original co-sponsors.

In a statement made to The New York Times, Castro characterized the expansion of Israeli settlements in the West Bank as a major obstacle to peace, saying "Democrats must face this with urgency — act now or watch the prospect of Palestinian self-determination slip away forever," adding, "Congress should and can be using every tool we have available, including sanctions."

As of October 16, 2026, the Act has 53 co-sponsors.

== Reception ==
The Act was endorsed by J Street, the IMEU Policy Project, and New Jewish Narrative.

== See also ==
- Senate Resolution 852, proposed resolution required the State Department to report to Congress on Israel's human rights practices and violence in the West Bank, including the killings of Americans
- E1 Sanctions Act, proposed 2026 Act of Congress to sanction individuals or groups that facilitate Israeli settlements of the E1 area in the Israeli-occupied West Bank
