= E1 Sanctions Act =

Proposed US legislation

- Long title: To impose sanctions with respect to foreign persons that have facilitated Israeli settlement construction in the E1 area of the West Bank.

Legislative history
- Introduced in the Senate by Chris Coons on September 23, 2026; Committee consideration by United States Senate Committee on Banking, Housing, and Urban Affairs

The E1 Sanctions Act is a proposed 2026 Act of Congress to sanction individuals or groups that facilitate Israeli settlements of the E1 area in the Israeli-occupied West Bank. The E1 area bisects a tract of land between East Jerusalem and the occupied West Bank that is sought for a future Palestinian state.

== Legislative history ==
The Act was introduced on September 23, 2026, with lead sponsors Chris Coons of Delaware, Elizabeth Warren of Massachusetts, Ron Wyden of Oregon, and Ruben Gallego of Arizona.

In a statement, Coons said, "as Palestinian civilians face a campaign of destruction and fear from violent extremist settlers, the United States must send a strong message that this behavior is unacceptable and that it remains committed to freedom, security, prosperity and self-determination for all Israelis and Palestinians."

== Provisions ==
The act would sanction individuals, entities, and foreign companies determined by the Treasury Department to be complicit in the construction of Israeli settlements in the E1 area, including those who submit bids for E1 tenders. It would also sanction those attempting to direct, organize, facilitate or transfer Israeli civilians into E1 area settlements.

== See also ==
- Stop the Settlements Act, proposed Act of Congress to impose sanctions on entities and individuals building or expanding settlements in the occupied West Bank and Gaza
