= Issawiya =

Palestinian neighborhood in East Jerusalem

Coordinates: 31°47′55″N 35°14′54″E

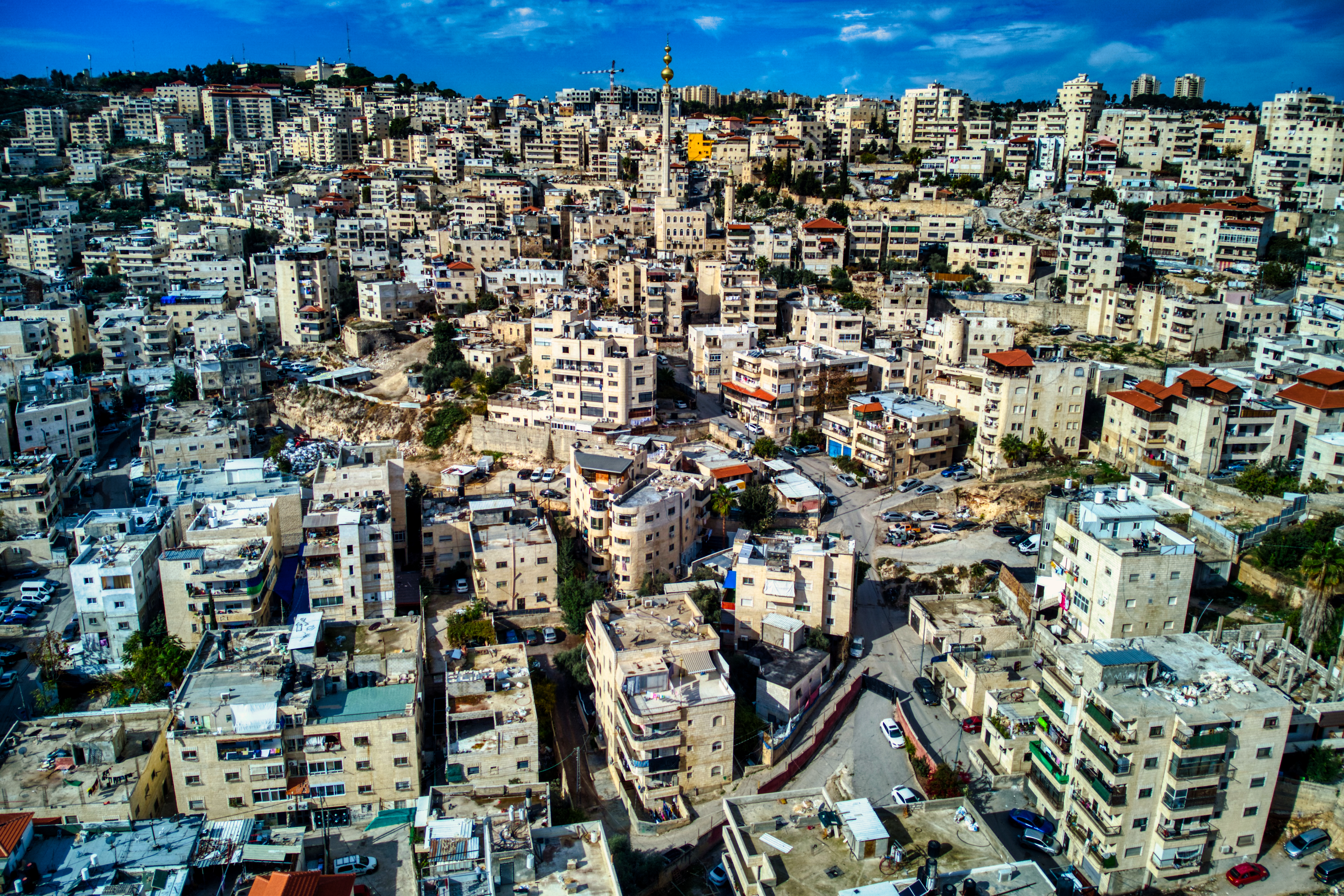
Al-Issawiya

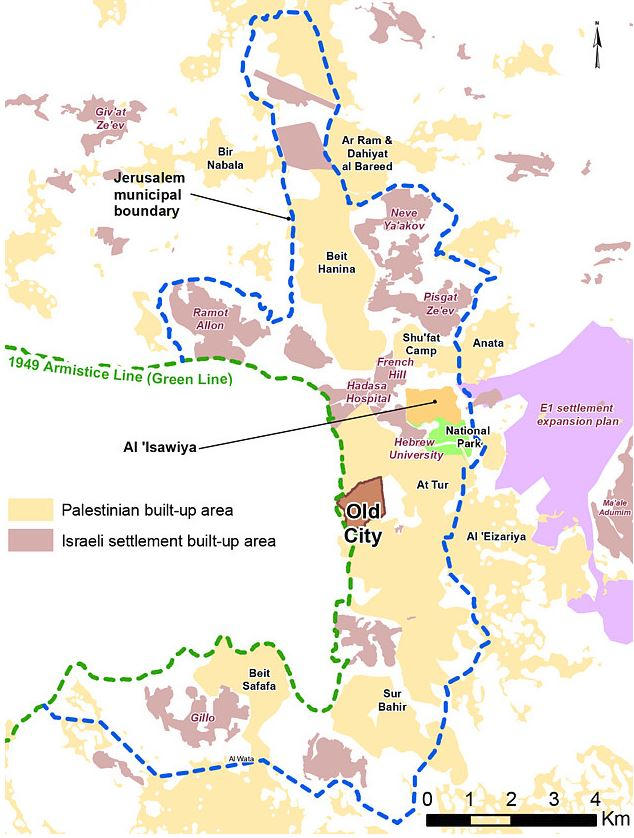
Schematic map of Palestinian neighborhood of Isawiya in relation to other Israeli and Palestinian built-up areas.

Al-Issawiya (Arabic: العيساوية, Hebrew: עיסאוויה, also spelled Isawiya or Isawiyah) is a Palestinian neighborhood in East Jerusalem. It is located on the eastern slopes of the Mount Scopus ridge. To the east and north, it is bordered by Road 1, which connects Jerusalem with the settlement of Ma’ale Adumim; immediately adjoining it to the north, west and southwest are the Hadassah Medical Center, the Hebrew University campus, the Jewish settlement of French Hill and the Ofarit military base; to the south, there is a planned park, the Mount Scopus slopes national park.

In 1945, the village lands encompassed 10,417 dunams.

Issawiya is located at the foot of French Hill, northwest of the road to Ma'ale Adumim. Under the jurisdiction of the Jerusalem Municipality, its citizens are permanent residents of the city, entitled to live and work in Israel without special permits. As permanent residents, they are also entitled to social benefits provided by Bituah Leumi (Israeli National Insurance Institute) and Israeli health insurance.

== Etymology ==
Edward Henry Palmer in 1881 thought that the name meant "the place or sect of Jesus (called 'Isa in Arabic)."

== History ==
A burial cave, with pottery dating to the Early Roman period (first century CE), has been found at Issawiya.

Two burial chambers were documented in 2003, one dating to the Roman period, the other to the Byzantine era (sixth–eighth centuries CE). A burial cave with a 4 line inscription in Greek have been examined, the inscription ascribes the tomb to the daughters of the Kyros family.

=== Ottoman Empire ===
Issawiya, like the rest of Palestine, was incorporated into the Ottoman Empire in 1517, and in the 1560s the revenues of al- Issawiya were designated for the waqf of Hasseki Sultan Imaret in Jerusalem, established by Hasseki Hurrem Sultan (Roxelana), wife of Suleiman the Magnificent. In the 1596 tax registers it appeared as Isawiyya, in the Nahiya of Quds of the Liwa of Quds, with a population of 35 households and 3 bachelors, all Muslim. The villages paid a fixed tax-rate of 33.3% on wheat, barley, olive trees, vineyards, fruit trees, goats and beehives; a total of 6,940 akçe.

In 1838 it was noted as "a little village", located in the el Wadiyeh region, east of Jerusalem. An Ottoman village list from about 1870 found that Issawiya had a population of 178, (or 78), in 29 houses, though the population count included only men.

In 1883, the Palestine Exploration Fund's Survey of Western Palestine described El Aisawiyeh as a "small village on the eastern slope of the chain of Olivet, with a spring to the south and a few olives round it." Another source states the locals grew vegetables, which were sold in Jerusalem.

In 1896 the population was estimated to be about 210 persons.

=== British Mandate ===
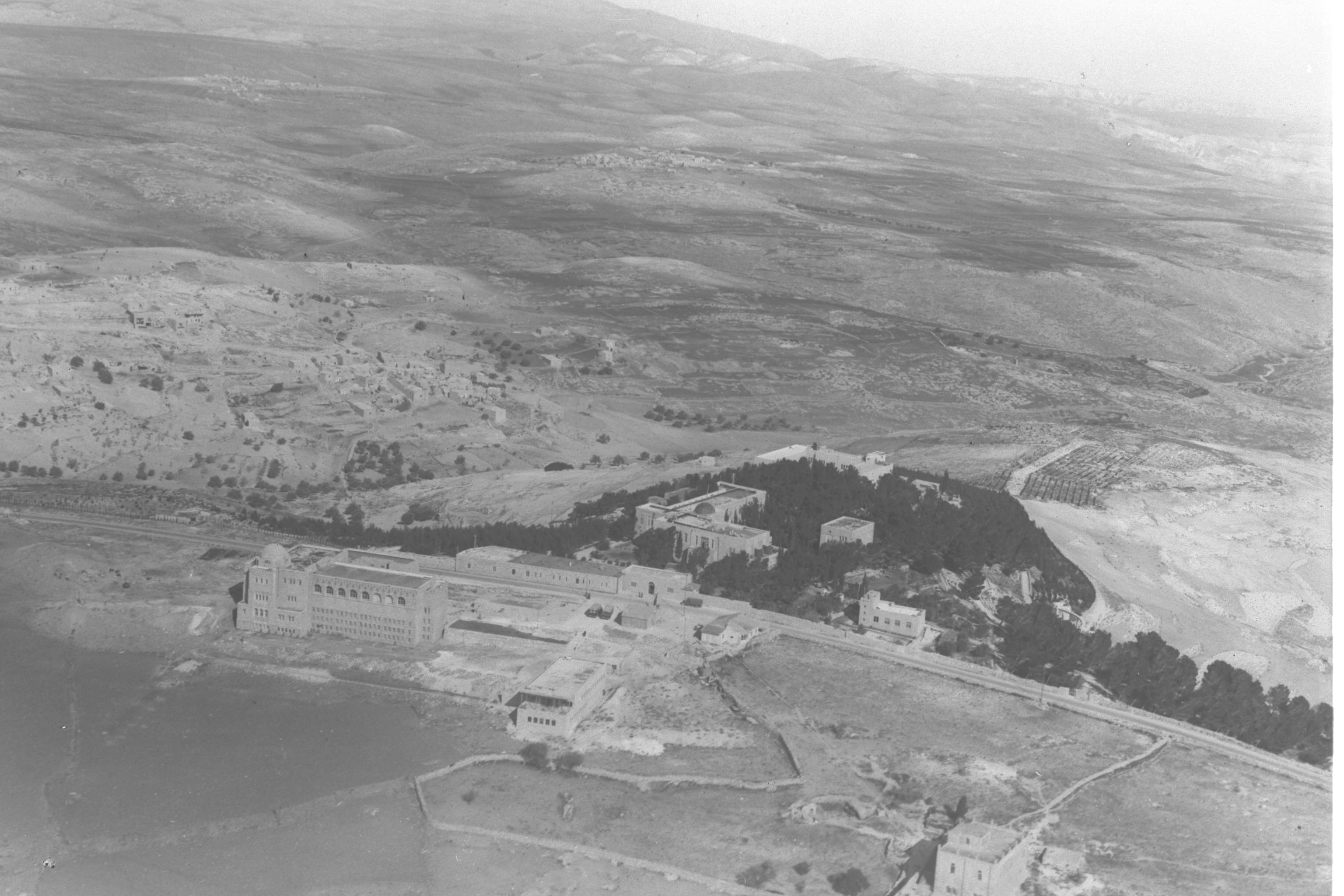
’Isawiyeh 1937, with Hebrew University in foreground

In the 1922 census of Palestine, conducted by the British Mandate authorities, 'Isawiyeh had a population of 333, all Muslims, increasing in the 1931 census to a population of 558; 7 Christians and the rest Muslim, occupying 117 houses.

In the 1945 statistics the population of Issawiya was 730; 720 Muslims and 10 Christians, who owned 10,108 dunams of land while 235 dunams had Jewish owners, according to an official land and population survey. 3,291 dunams were used for cereals, while 47 dunams were built-up (urban) land.

=== Jordan and Israel ===
The Mount Scopus Agreement signed on July 7, 1948, regulated the demilitarised zone and authorized the United Nations Truce Supervision Organization to settle disputes between Israel and Jordan. One area of conflict involved two Jewish-owned plots in Issawiya, known as Gan Shlomit or Salomons Garden, which were purchased by V.F. Salomons in 1934 and sold to the Gan Shlomit Company, Ltd. in 1937.

In 1961, the population was 1,163, according to a Jordanian census. In 1964, Issawiya had a population of 1,300. It was located at this time within the Mount Scopus demilitarized zone, an unsupervised demilitarized zone between Jordan and Israel.

=== Israel ===
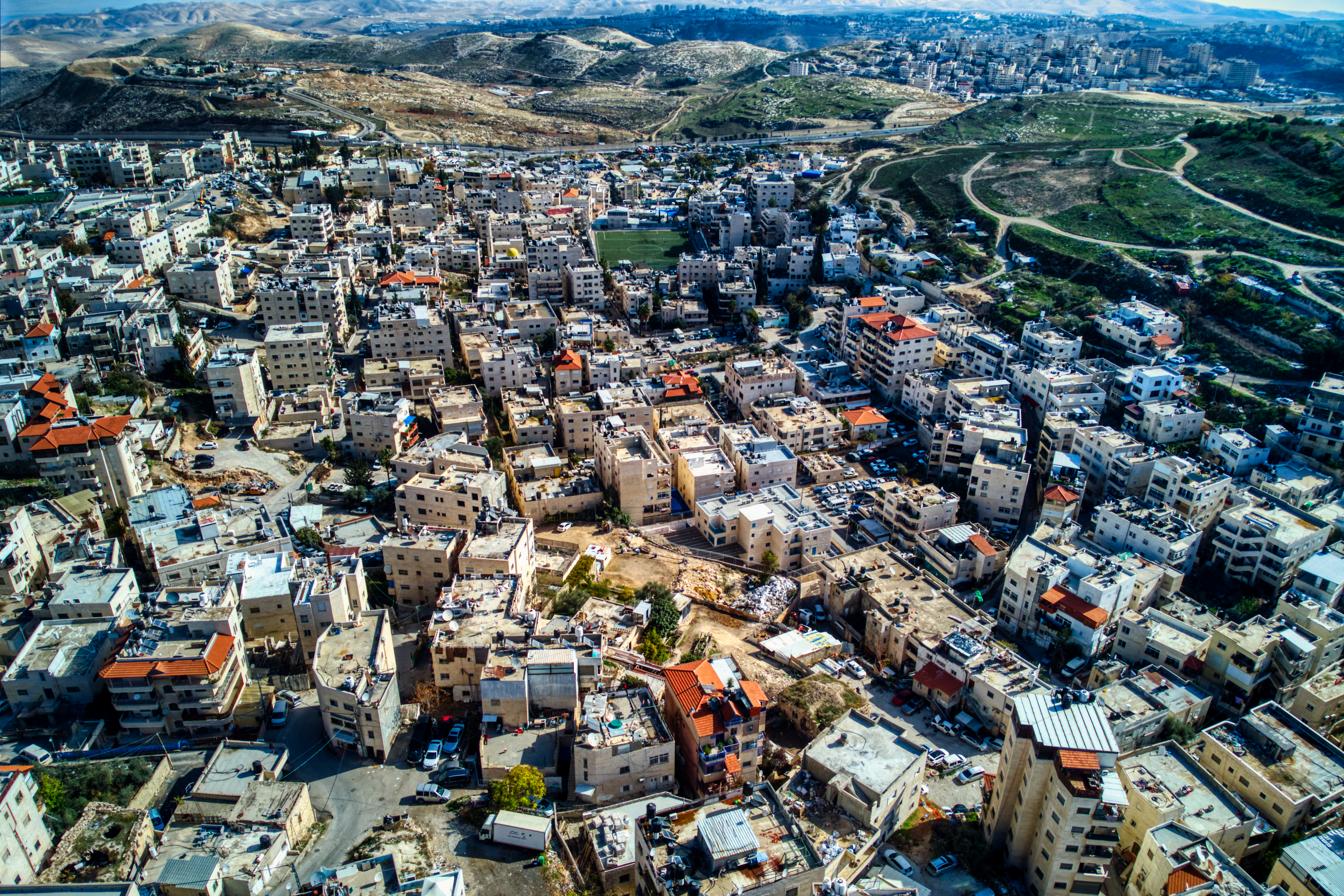
Issawiya, 2022

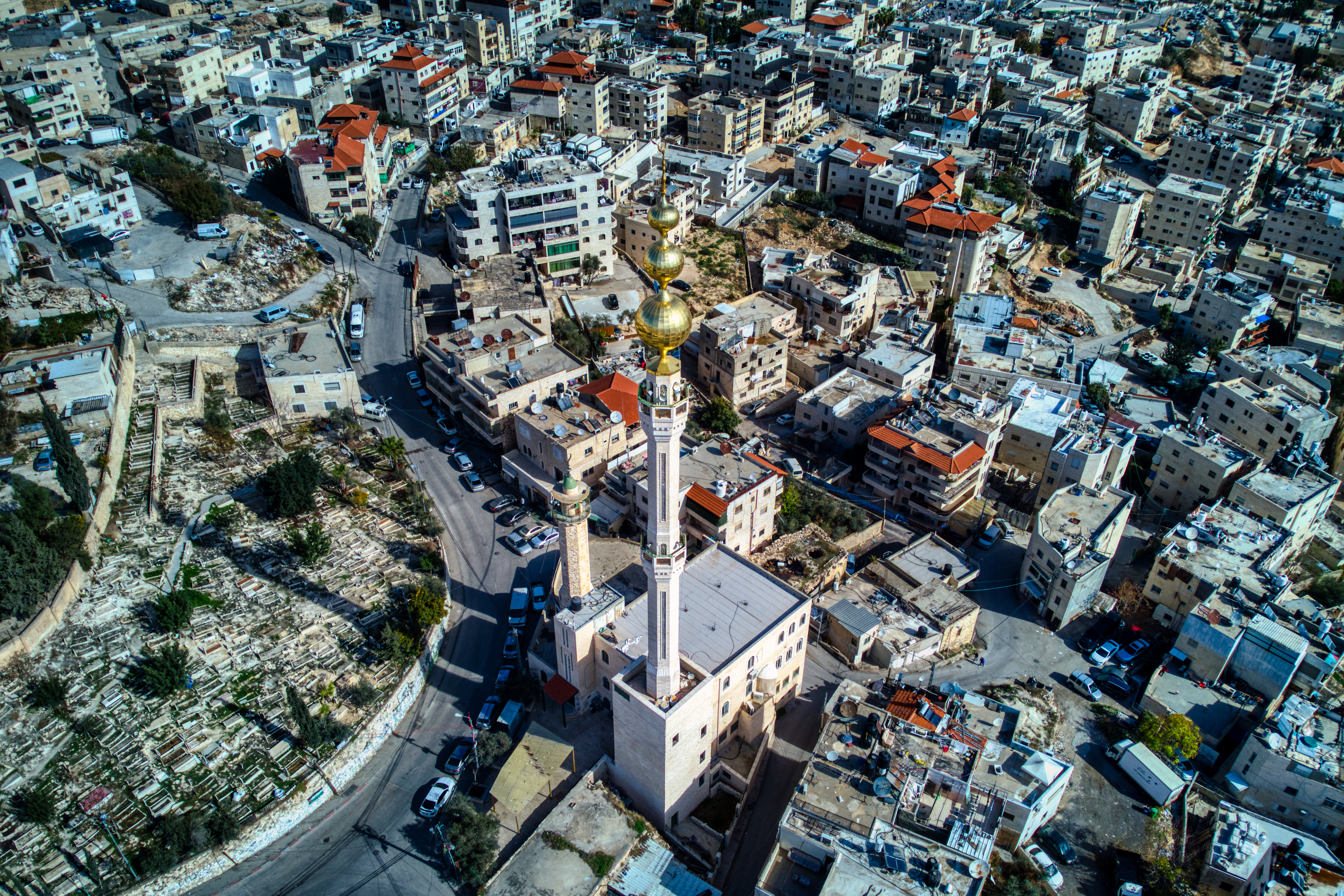
A mosque in Issawiya, 2022

Issawiya has been occupied by Israel since the Six-Day War in 1967. In that year Israel expropriated approximately one quarter of Isawiya's lands (2,230 dunams). In January 1968 it appropriated a further 600 dunams. In 1975, 2,900 dunams of Issawiya land not annexed to Jerusalem were also expropriated as part of the development of Ma'ale Adumim. Some 100 dunams were then confiscated in 1982 to build route 1. From the mid eighties to the early 2000s Israel also reclassified another 3,800 dunams of Issawiya land not under cultivation as Israeli state land, and, in 2002 seized another 45 dunams to establish the Metzudat Adumim Border Police base, a measure which blocked Issawiya residents from accessing the little arable land left to them. By 2020, a development plan for an interchange near the eastern entrance to the village foresaw a prohibition on Issawiya residents from using a further 90 dunams. The Israel Nature and Parks Authority, together with the Jerusalem Municipal Council plans also to expropriate approximately a further 900 dunams, 450 for the Mount Scopus Slopes National Park and 450 for a construction-waste and dirt landfill.

B'tselem has claimed that since the beginning of the occupation Israel has taken 90% of Isawiya's land, using a variety of devices from outright expropriation, declaring areas “state land” to military seizure. According to ARIJ, Issawiya had 1,212 dunums of land confiscated by Israel in order to construct various Israeli settlements and expand the Hebrew University:

- 568 dunums for the Hebrew University in 1968,
- 394 dunums for Giv’at Shappira (French Hill) in 1968,
- 248 dunums for Mishr Adummim in 1974,
- 2 dunums for Ma’ale Adummim in 1975.

It is one of the poorest Jerusalem neighbourhoods. According to B'tselem, citing community leaders, the population is some 22,000 people while planners commissioned by the municipality and the local leadership say there are 3,700 to 4,000 apartments. The average population density is 25 people per dunam, almost three times the 8.9 in French Hill and 3.5 times the average population density in Jerusalem. Again, according to the same NGO, since April 2019, Issawiya has been subject to an ongoing campaign of harassment and collective punishment. By 2020, Israeli authorities had issued 136 pending demolition orders for homes in the neighborhood.

As of May 2020, for over a year, Special Patrol Unit and Border Police forces regularly enter the neighborhood; "It is evident that the police are not responding to disturbances in the neighborhood, on the contrary. The incursions spark the disturbance and there is compelling evidence that this is precisely the purpose of the nightly raids…" according to FMEP. Given the purpose, intensity and modality of these operations, they may amount to collective punishment according to human rights organizations.

== Land registry ==
Under Jordanian rule, land in Issawiya was registered under the owner's name, but registration stopped in 1967. Residents who apply for building permits are frequently turned down because ownership cannot be proven. Another problem is that land may belong to as many as ten clans. The land would need to be unified and then divided between all residents who claim ownership.. Israeli municipal data in 2015 calculated that Issawiya had 1,840 apartments, while a joint planning commission set the current figure (2020) at 3,700-4,000.

== Education ==
According to the local mukhtar, 800 students in al-Issawiya lack classrooms. This has caused strikes among the students and protests among community leaders and parents. According to the Association for Civil Rights in Israel, the difference in schooling-standard between East and West Jerusalem is "staggering". A girls' school in al-Issawiya is one of five elementary schools in the Jerusalem area that teach philosophy to third-graders as part of a program operating in 70 countries. A project sponsored by the Hebrew University of Jerusalem coordinates educational work with youth in Issawiya. Palestinian-Israeli students at the university undergo a training seminar that provides them with the requisite teaching and facilitation skills.

== Economy ==
Some residents of the neighborhood work at Hadassah Medical Center, located on a hill overlooking the neighborhood.

== Sports ==
In 2005, the Peres Center for Peace inaugurated a synthetic turf soccer field in Issawiya as part of the Twinned Peace Soccer School project. The soccer field was a priority in 1993 during Teddy Kollek's election year and had been allocated funding at the time, but was finally built with South Korean funding.

== See also ==
- Samer Tariq Issawi

== Bibliography ==
- ‘Adawi, Zubair; Abu Raya, Rafeh (2005-03-10). "Jerusalem, 'Issawiya, Final Report" (117). Hadashot Arkheologiyot – Excavations and Surveys in Israel.
- ‘Adawi, Zubair (2009-12-22). "Jerusalem, 'Issawiya, Final Report" (121). Hadashot Arkheologiyot – Excavations and Surveys in Israel.
- ‘Adawi, Zubair (2012-02-09). "Jerusalem, 'Issawiya, Final Report" (124). Hadashot Arkheologiyot – Excavations and Surveys in Israel.
- ‘Adawi, Zubair; Barda, Leticia; Dagan, Yehuda (2013-12-31). "Jerusalem, 'Issawiya, Final Report" (125). Hadashot Arkheologiyot – Excavations and Surveys in Israel.
- Barron, J.B., ed. (1923). Palestine: Report and General Abstracts of the Census of 1922. Government of Palestine.
- B'tselem (May 2020). This is Jerusalem: Violence and Dispossession in al-'Esawiyah (PDF) (Report). B'tselem.
- Conder, C.R.; Kitchener, H.H. (1883). The Survey of Western Palestine: Memoirs of the Topography, Orography, Hydrography, and Archaeology. Vol. 3. London: Committee of the Palestine Exploration Fund.
- Government of Jordan, Department of Statistics (1964). First Census of Population and Housing. Volume I: Final Tables; General Characteristics of the Population (PDF).
- Government of Palestine, Department of Statistics (1945). Village Statistics, April, 1945.
- Hadawi, S. (1970). Village Statistics of 1945: A Classification of Land and Area ownership in Palestine. Palestine Liberation Organization Research Centre.
- Hartmann, M. (1883). "Die Ortschaftenliste des Liwa Jerusalem in dem türkischen Staatskalender für Syrien auf das Jahr 1288 der Flucht (1871)". Zeitschrift des Deutschen Palästina-Vereins. 6: 102–149.
- Hill, Gray (1899). "A remarkable cistern and newly discovered spring as Aisawiyeh". Quarterly Statement - Palestine Exploration Fund. 31: 45–46.
- Hütteroth, W.-D.; Abdulfattah, K. (1977). Historical Geography of Palestine, Transjordan and Southern Syria in the Late 16th Century. Erlanger Geographische Arbeiten, Sonderband 5. Erlangen, Germany: Vorstand der Fränkischen Geographischen Gesellschaft. ISBN 3-920405-41-2.
- Mills, E., ed. (1932). Census of Palestine 1931. Population of Villages, Towns and Administrative Areas. Jerusalem: Government of Palestine.
- Palmer, E.H. (1881). The Survey of Western Palestine: Arabic and English Name Lists Collected During the Survey by Lieutenants Conder and Kitchener, R. E. Transliterated and Explained by E.H. Palmer. Committee of the Palestine Exploration Fund.
- Re'em, Amit; Abu Raya, Rafeh (2007-03-11). "Jerusalem, 'Issawiya" (119). Hadashot Arkheologiyot – Excavations and Surveys in Israel.
- Robinson, E.; Smith, E. (1841). Biblical Researches in Palestine, Mount Sinai and Arabia Petraea: A Journal of Travels in the year 1838. Vol. 2. Boston: Crocker & Brewster.
- Robinson, E.; Smith, E. (1841). Biblical Researches in Palestine, Mount Sinai and Arabia Petraea: A Journal of Travels in the year 1838. Vol. 3. Boston: Crocker & Brewster.
- Schick, C. (1896). "Zur Einwohnerzahl des Bezirks Jerusalem". Zeitschrift des Deutschen Palästina-Vereins. 19: 120–127.
- Singer, A. (2002). Constructing Ottoman Beneficence: An Imperial Soup Kitchen in Jerusalem. Albany: State University of New York Press. ISBN 0-7914-5352-9.
- Socin, A. (1879). "Alphabetisches Verzeichniss von Ortschaften des Paschalik Jerusalem". Zeitschrift des Deutschen Palästina-Vereins. 2: 135–163.
- Toledano, E. (1984). "The Sanjaq of Jerusalem in the Sixteenth Century: Aspects of Topography and Population". Archivum Ottomanicum. 9: 279–319. Archived from the original on 2016-03-05.
