= Samer Tariq Issawi =

Palestinian prisoner in Israel (born 1979)

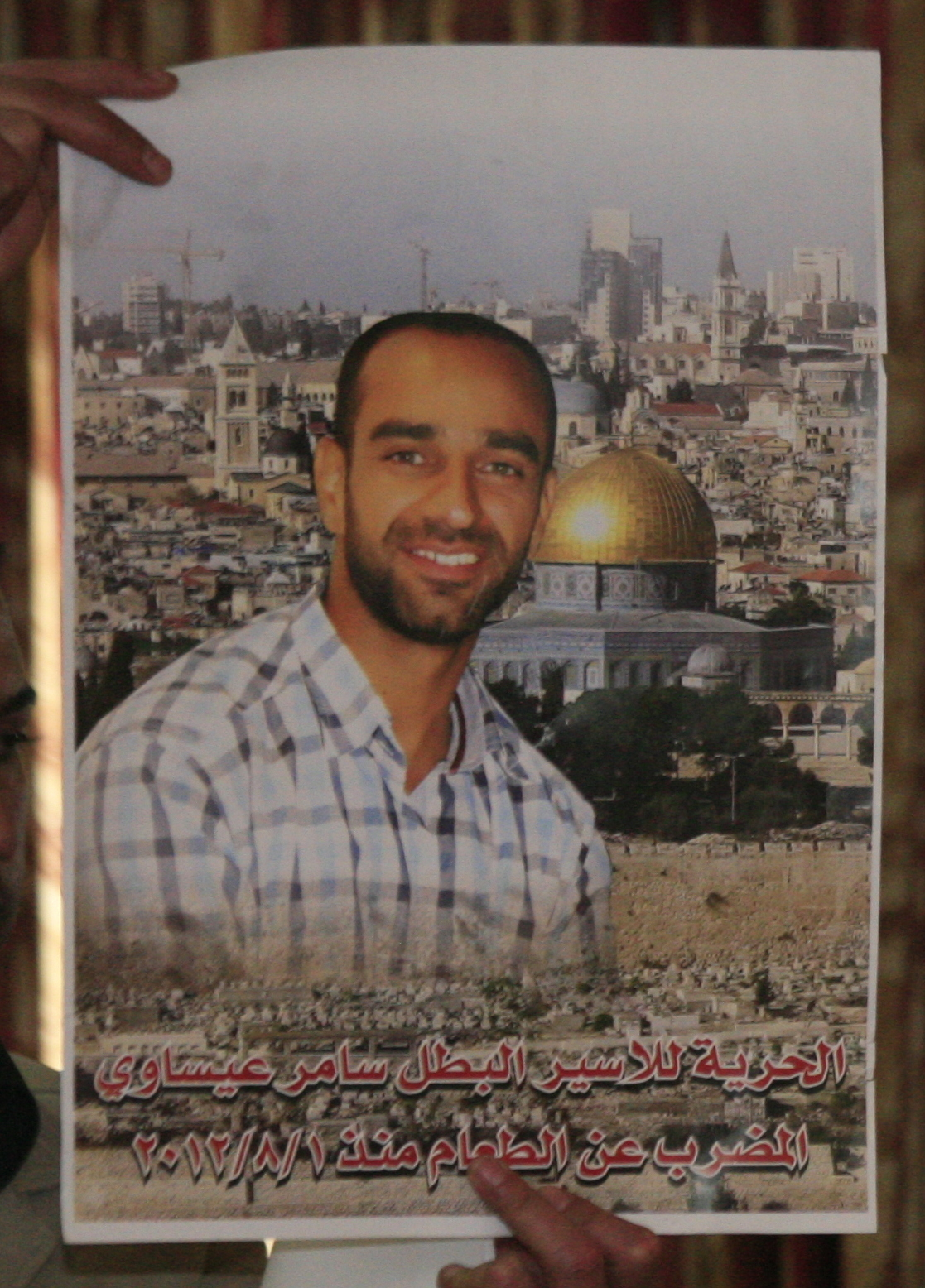

Samer Tariq Issawi (born December 16, 1979, in Issawiyeh, north east of Jerusalem) is a member of the Democratic Front for the Liberation of Palestine who is currently serving a long-term prison sentence in Israel on terrorism-related charges.

On 15 April 2002, Samer was detained by the Israeli army in Ramallah as part of Operation Defensive Shield during the Second Intifada. He was alleged to have manufactured and distributed pipe bombs and in several instances fired indiscriminately at Israeli civilians. He was convicted of membership in an illegal organization, possession of explosives, and attempted murder.

Nearly 10 years later, in October 2011, Samer was released along with 1027 Palestinian prisoners as a result of an Egypt-brokered deal between Hamas and the Israeli government for the return of Gilad Shalit. However, on 7 July 2012, he was re-detained near for violating the terms of his release by leaving Jerusalem and entering the West Bank. His lawyer Andre Rosenthal stated that he had been taking his car to be fixed at a garage in the West Bank.

He was convicted of an 8-month sentence, which according to the terms of his release could include a reinstatement of the rest of his original 26-year sentence. Issawi began a hunger strike in August 2012.

On 7 January 2013, a protest took place in Washington, D.C., in support of Issawi.

Mahmoud Abbas, president of the Palestinian state, sent a letter to UN Secretary General Ban Ki-moon and began a publicity campaign on 13 February 2013 to raise awareness of the condition of Issawi and three other prisoners of Israel engaged in a hunger strike to protest that they were being held in prison without being convicted.

On April 22, 2013, it was announced that Samer was ending his hunger strike. A deal had been reached where Samer would serve eight months for violating the terms of his bail, and then be released to Jerusalem. However, he was detained again, six months after his release. In 2015 he renewed his hunger strike.
