= Yeshivat HaKotel =

Coordinates: 31.7752469°N 35.2326693°E

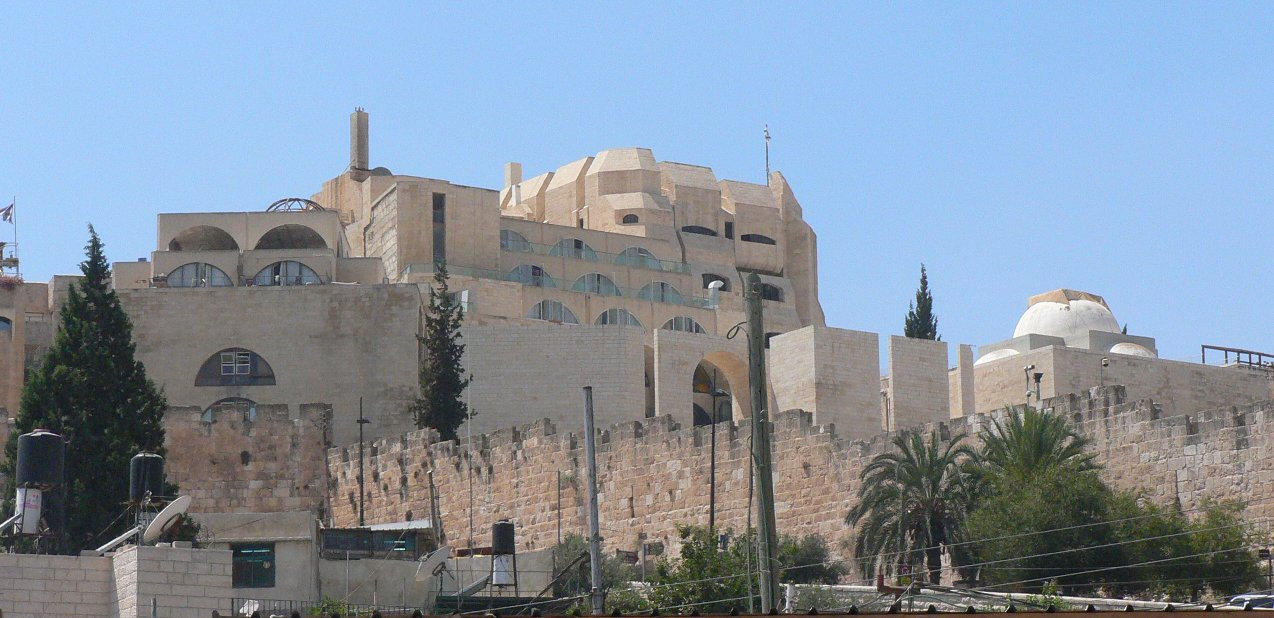
The Yeshivat Hakotel building, situated above the arches of the Porat Yosef Yeshiva

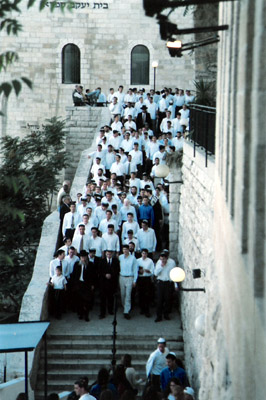
HaKotel Yeshiva students walking to the Western Wall on Sabbath eve with the Rosh Yeshiva Reb Yeshayahu Hadari

Yeshivat HaKotel (Hebrew: ישיבת הכותל, lit. 'Yeshiva of the Western Wall') is a religious Zionist Hesder yeshiva in the Old City of Jerusalem, opposite the Temple Mount and overlooking the Kotel (Western Wall), hence its name. Most of the students are in the Israeli Hesder program which combines at least fifteen months of army service with several years of Yeshiva study.

Baruch Wieder, the former rosh kollel, is the rosh yeshiva. The previous rosh yeshiva was Yeshayahu Hadari, who served for more than thirty years, although not consecutively. Mordechai Elon was rosh yeshiva from 2002–2006.

Yeshivat HaKotel has a program for English-speaking students, headed by Rabbi Reuven Taragin, that offers integration with Israelis, a broad comprehensive curriculum in Talmud, Tanakh, Machshava, Halacha, and Mussar.

In 2006, Yeshivat HaKotel opened a new program for Portuguese and Spanish-speaking students headed by Brazilian-born rabbi Daniel Segal. As of 2011, more than 100 students from Latin American countries, including Brazil, Argentina, Uruguay, Mexico, Panama, Peru and Colombia, and also from Portugal and Spain, have graduated this program.

== History ==
The yeshiva was founded shortly after the Six-Day War in 1967 in the Old City of Jerusalem by Aryeh Bina, who at that time was a rabbi in Yeshivat Netiv Meir. The first Shavuot after the war, approximately a week after the recapture of the old city, Bina and his students began studying in former Jordanian barracks, then relocated to a homeless shelter in the "old square."

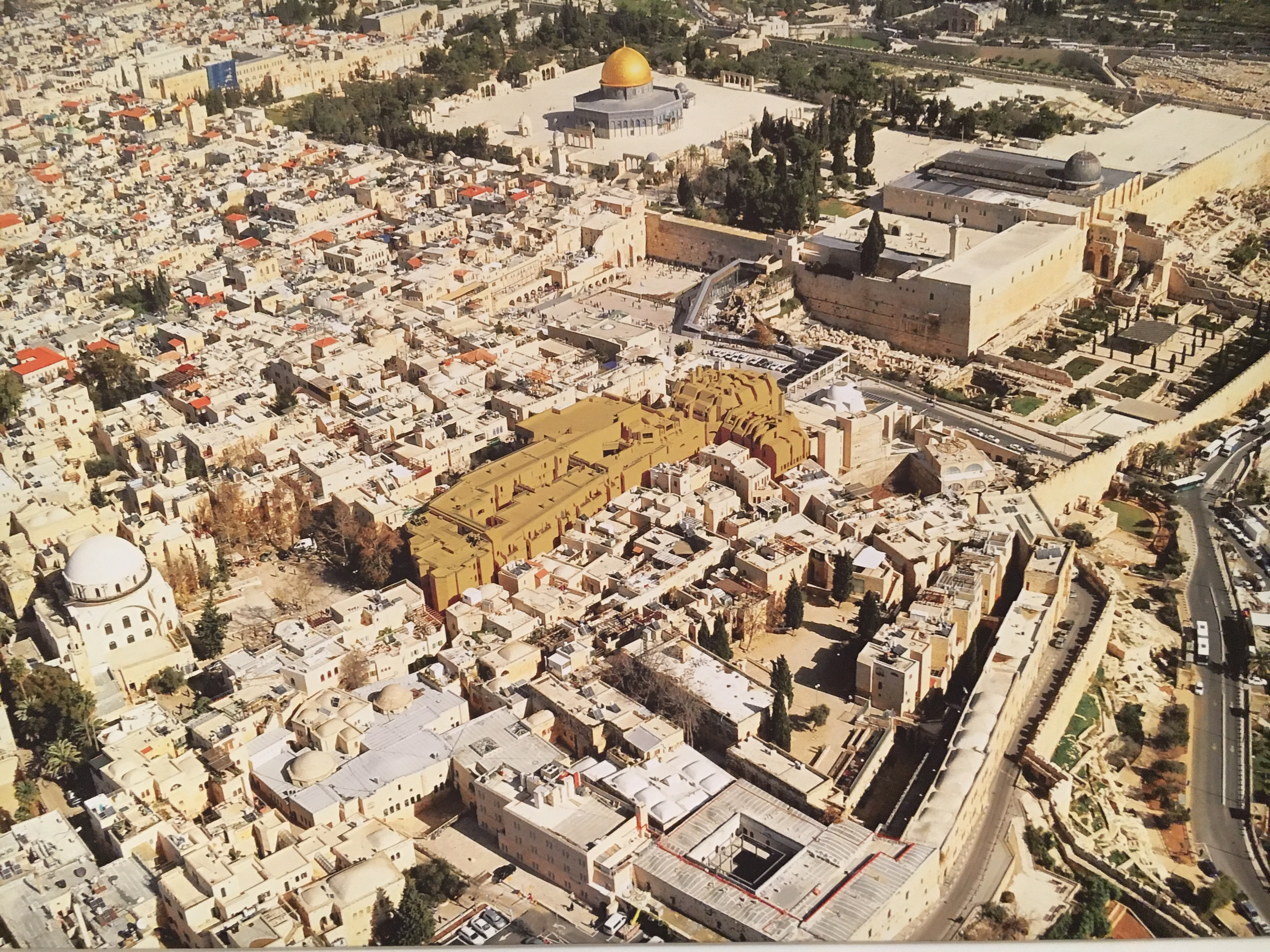
Yeshivat Hakotel building in the Old City of Jerusalem

In the early 1980s, the yeshiva moved to its current location. While the foundation was being dug, an archaeological site was discovered, now known as the Herodian Quarter. This significantly delayed the building's construction while archaeological excavations were completed so the building was not dedicated until the middle of the 1980s. It now covers the largest area of any building in the Jewish Quarter. The dormitories are designed to house 350 students.

== Notable alumni ==
- Menachem Froman, founding member of Gush Emunim and former chief rabbi of Tekoa
- Haim Sabato, cofounder and rosh yeshiva of Yeshivat Birkat Moshe (Ma'aleh Adumim)
- Yitzchak Sheilat, cofounder and rosh yeshiva of Yeshivat Birkat Moshe (Ma'aleh Adumim)
- Yitzhak Levy, Knesset member
- Rafi Peretz, Chief Military Rabbi
