= Yeshayahu Hadari =

Israeli rabbi

Rabbi Yeshayahu Hadari ישעיהו הדרי
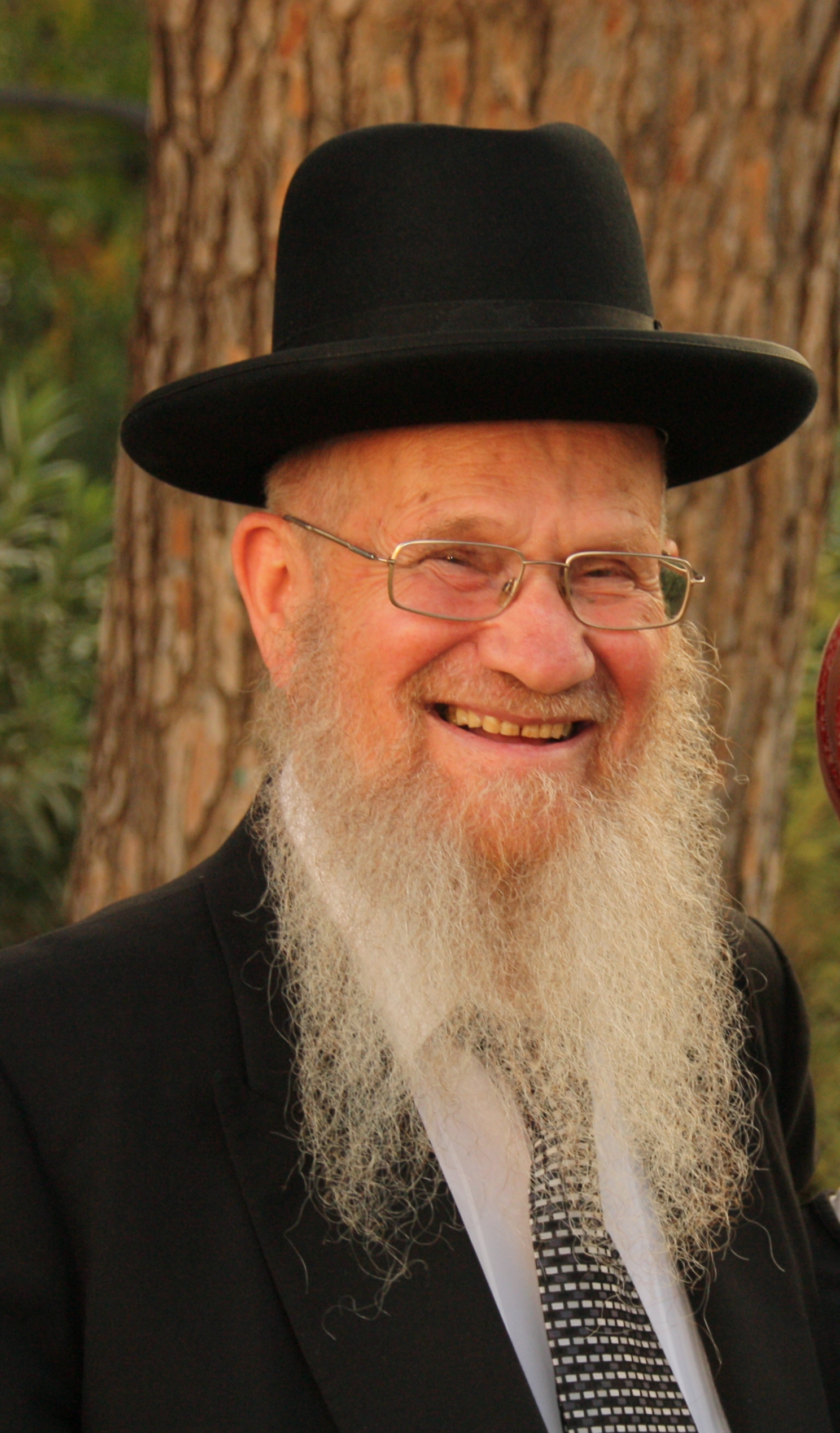

Personal life
- Born: 1933 Tel Aviv
- Died: 25 April 2018 (aged 84–85) Jerusalem
- Education: Hebron Yeshiva

Religious life
- Religion: Judaism
- Denomination: Orthodox

Jewish leader
- Position: Rosh yeshiva
- Yeshiva: Yeshivat HaKotel

Yeshayahu Hadari (Hebrew: ישעיהו הדרי; 1933 – April 25, 2018) was an Israeli rabbi. He served as the first rosh yeshiva of Yeshivat HaKotel, a position he held for over thirty years.

== Biography ==
Yeshayahu Hadari was born in Tel Aviv in 1933. In his youth, he studied at the Bilu School and at Yeshivat HaYishuv HaChadash in the city. Later on, he studied at the Chevron Yeshiva in Jerusalem. He was close to Zvi Yehuda Kook and David Cohen, the "Rav HaNazir".

In 1955, he was critically wounded by a grenade blast. After waking from an extended coma, the name Chaim (meaning "life") was added to his name to signify his survival of a near-death experience.

In March 1957, he married Naomi Rakover, the daughter of Chaim Rakover and the granddaughter of Simcha Mandelbaum. She died in July 2026.

In 1962, Hadari was appointed mashgiach ruchani at Yeshivat Kerem B'Yavneh, where he worked for three years. During the 1960s and 1970s, Hadari gave talks on the daily Bible chapter on the radio.

In 1967, Hadari was appointed to head the prestigious Yeshivat HaKotel in the Jewish Quarter of the Old City of Jerusalem. Over the decades, he taught thousands of students. He was the author of several books, including commentaries on the works of Abraham Isaac Kook.

Hadari died in Jerusalem on April 25, 2018 at the age of 84.

== Sources ==
- Yeshayahu Hadari Sichot - Yeshivat Hakotel
- Yeshayahu Hadari Wikipedia page - Hebrew
