= Mishor Adumim =

Industrial park located in the Israeli settlement of Maʽale Adumim in the West Bank

Mishor Adumim Industrial Park פארק תעשייה מישור אדומים
- Industrial park
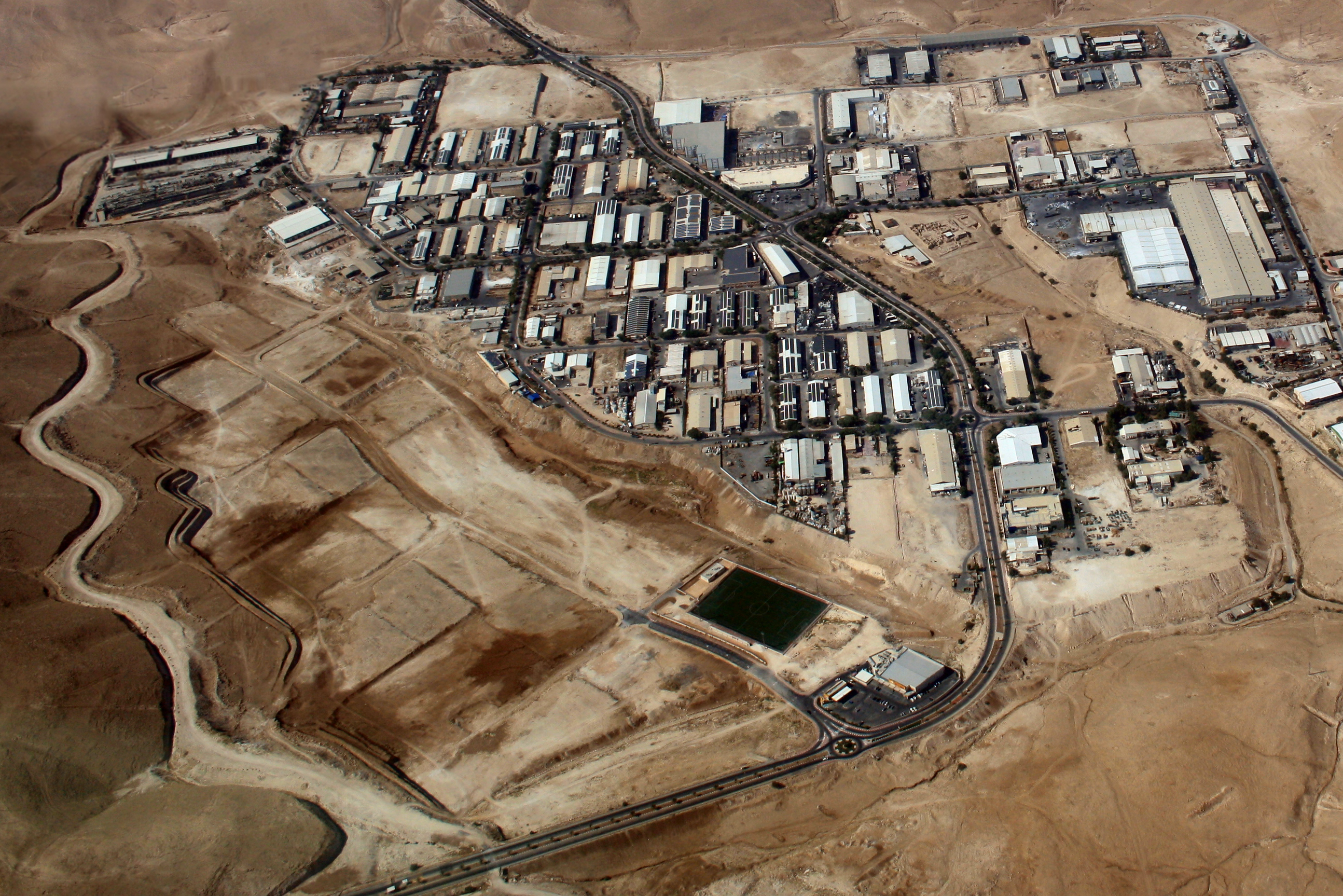
- Aerial view of Mishor Adumim industrial park
- Etymology: Plain of Adumim
- Location within the Central West Bank
- Coordinates: 31°47′50.40″N 35°19′54.70″E
- Region: West Bank
- District: Judea and Samaria Area
- Council: Ma'ale Adumim
- Founded: 1998
- Founder: Ma'aleh Adumim; Economic Development Co. Ltd.
- Area: 1,550 dunams (1.55 km^{2}; 0.60 sq mi)
- Population: 400 businesses
  - Density: 260/km^{2} (670/sq mi)

Mishor Adumim (Hebrew: מישור אדומים) is an industrial park located in the industrial zone of the Israeli settlement of Ma'ale Adumim, about 10 minutes' drive from Jerusalem, in the West Bank.

The international community considers Israeli settlements in the West Bank illegal under international law, but the Israeli government disputes this.

== History ==
According to ARIJ, Israel confiscated land from the following Palestinian villages in order to construct Mishor Adumim:

- 2,749 dunams from al-Eizariya,
- 248 dunams from Isawiya,
- 138 dunams from az-Za'ayyem.

Since 1998, the park has been managed by the Ma'aleh Adumim Economic Development Company Ltd. Stretching over 1,550 dunams (1.55 km^{2}; 0.60 sq mi), it includes businesses and factories, as well as a busy commercial center. In 2014, the park housed 300 factories and small businesses, a bowling alley, two large supermarkets, an art museum and several kosher wineries. These businesses are entitled to special tax breaks under Israeli law. A few, like the Shweiki glass factory, established in 1936, is Arab-owned: the Shweiki products are boycotted by Palestinian consumers, while the IDF refuses to give its seal of approval for the shatterproof glass it produces. One of the big draws is a Rami Levy supermarket. Adumim Food Ingredients is a food additives company that manufactures nutraceuticals in collaboration with the Hebrew University of Jerusalem. Most of the businesses rely heavily on Palestinian labour.

The SodaStream factory in Mishor Adumim provided employment for 1,300 workers: 950 Arabs (450 Israeli and 500 Palestinian) and 350 Israeli Jews. The SodaStream plant was established in Mishor Adumim by the company founder Peter Weissburgh in the 1990s, before SodaStream was taken over by the Fortismo Capital Fund in 2007. In 2014, Daniel Birnbaum, the current CEO said that he would not have opened the factory at this site, but its presence there was a reality and he would not bow to political pressure to close it, even after the inauguration of a new plant under construction in Lehavim in the northern Negev. According to Birnbaum, he would not consider closing the plant out of loyalty to its hundreds of Palestinian workers, noting that he could not see how it would help the Palestinian cause if they were fired. Nevertheless, the closure of the Mishor Adumim factory was announced in October 2015.

== Israeli-Palestinian conflict ==
Many Palestinians are employed at Mishor Adumim where they can make between double to triple the common wages in the Palestinian territories. One Palestinian worker said "I can bring a million people who want to work here".

According to a report by Haaretz in 2017, the Palestinians working in one of Mishor Adumim's factories, the Hayei Adam (Life of Man) carpentry shop which crafts furniture for synagogues, labour in sweatshop conditions.

The Rami Levy supermarket in Mishor Adumim is widely patronized by Palestinians, although Palestinian Authority Economy Minister Hassan Abu Libdeh warned them in 2010 not to make purchases there. Many of the employees are also Palestinian. On 3 December 2014, a Palestinian teenager entered the supermarket and stabbed two Israeli shoppers.

== See also ==
- Economy of Israel
- Laura of Euthymius
