= Haim Sabato =

Israeli rabbi and author

Rabbi Haim Sabato
- חיים סבתו
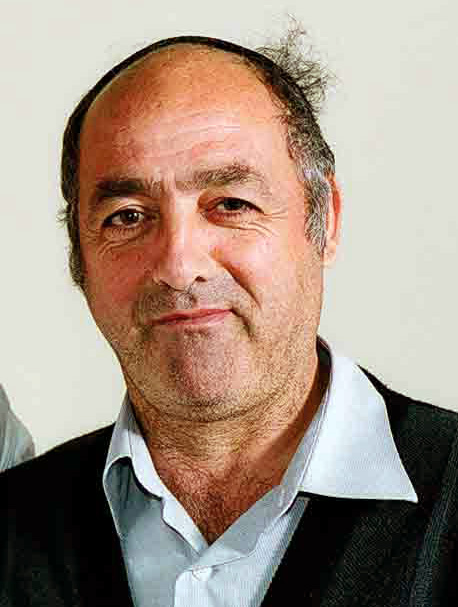
- Rabbi Haim Sabato

Co-founder of Yeshivat Birkat Moshe
- Incumbent
- Assumed office 1977

Personal life
- Born: 1952 (age 73–74) Cairo, Egypt
- Education: Mercaz HaRav, Yeshivat Hakotel
- Occupation: Rabbi, Author

Religious life
- Religion: Judaism
- Denomination: Orthodox

Haim Sabato (Hebrew: חיים סבתו) is an Israeli rabbi and author.

== Biography ==
Haim Sabato was born to a family of Aleppan-Syrian descent in Cairo. In the 1950s, his family immigrated to Israel and lived in a "ma'abara" (transit camp) in Kiryat HaYovel, Jerusalem. He studied at a Talmud Torah in Bayit Vegan, in the vicinity, and after that attended the "Netiv Meir" yeshiva high school, also in Bayit Vegan. Rabbi Aryeh Bina, Rosh Yeshiva of "Netiv Meir", was one of his key influences.

After graduation, he joined the "Hesder" program at Yeshivat Hakotel, in the Old City of Jerusalem, which combines yeshiva studies with military service. His experiences during the Yom Kippur War, at the age of 21, led him to write Adjusting Sights.

After the war, Sabato spent the next few years at Yeshivat Mercaz Harav, the spiritual home of religious Zionism. After receiving rabbinical ordination, Sabato co-founded Yeshivat Birkat Moshe in Ma'aleh Adumim, near Jerusalem, in 1977.

== Literary style ==
Sabato's lyrical writing, with sentences studded with phrases drawn from and referring to passages in the Bible and Talmud, has won him numerous fans and made him a symbol of the "pitfalls" of translating literary works from one language to another. He has published four novels in addition to Rabbinical works.

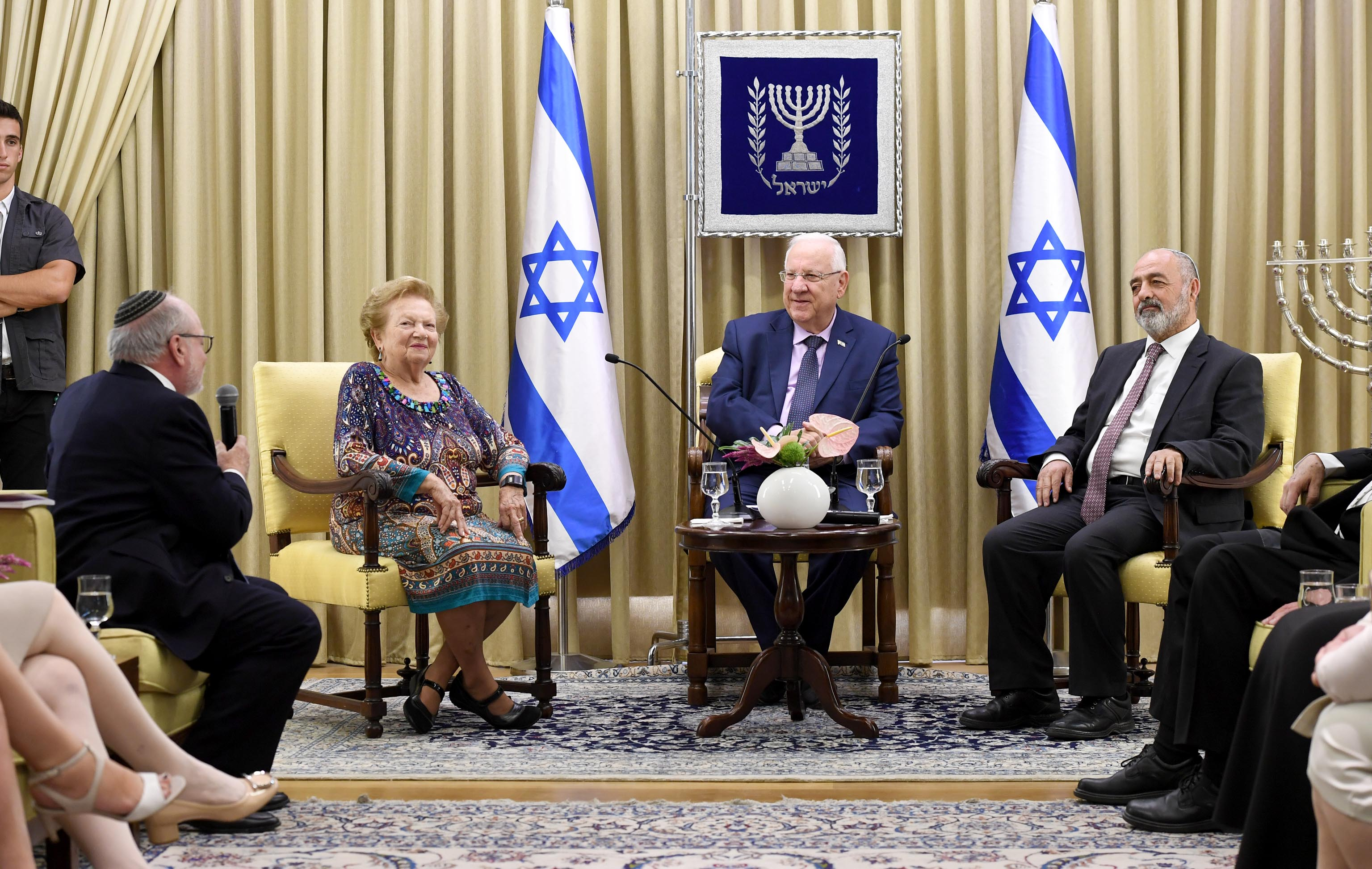
President Rivlin met with the Katz Prize winners for the implementation of Halakhah in modern life, July 2017. Rabbi Sabato on the right.

== Published works ==
Sabato's first book, Emet Mi Eretz Titzmach (published in English as Aleppo Tales), is a collection of short stories relating to his family's ancestral home and community of Aleppo, Syria.

Sabato was awarded the Sapir Prize for Literature in its inaugural year, as well as the Yitzhak Sadeh Prize, for his second work, Teum Kavanot (Adjusting Sights in the English translation), a moving account of the experiences of a soldier in the Yom Kippur War. The book has also been made into a film.

His third publication, Ke-Afapey Shachar (published in English as Dawning of the Day: A Jerusalem Tale), tells the story of Ezra Siman Tov, a religious Jerusalemite coming to terms with a changing world.

Sabato's next work, Boyi Ha-Ruach (published in English as From the Four Winds), describes his experiences as an "oleh chadash" (a new immigrant) in the Israeli "ma'abarot" (typical transit camps of the 1950s).

In his most recent book, Be-Shafrir Chevyon, Sabato returned to his childhood in "Beit Mazmil", Jerusalem, as a newcomer, with memories from Cairo intermingling with adventures in the monastery of Ein-Karem, and the annual Independence Day exhibition in Jerusalem. Again, the audience met both the Piutim (religious poetry) and Torah study that dominated Sabato's spiritual world, along with his Yom Kippur War memories, all tied together in a constant search for God.

=== Works translated into English ===
- Adjusting Sights
- Aleppo Tales
- The Dawning of the Day: A Jerusalem Tale
- From the Four Winds
