= Az-Za'ayyem =

az-Za'ayyem
- Municipality type D (Village council)

Arabic transcription(s)
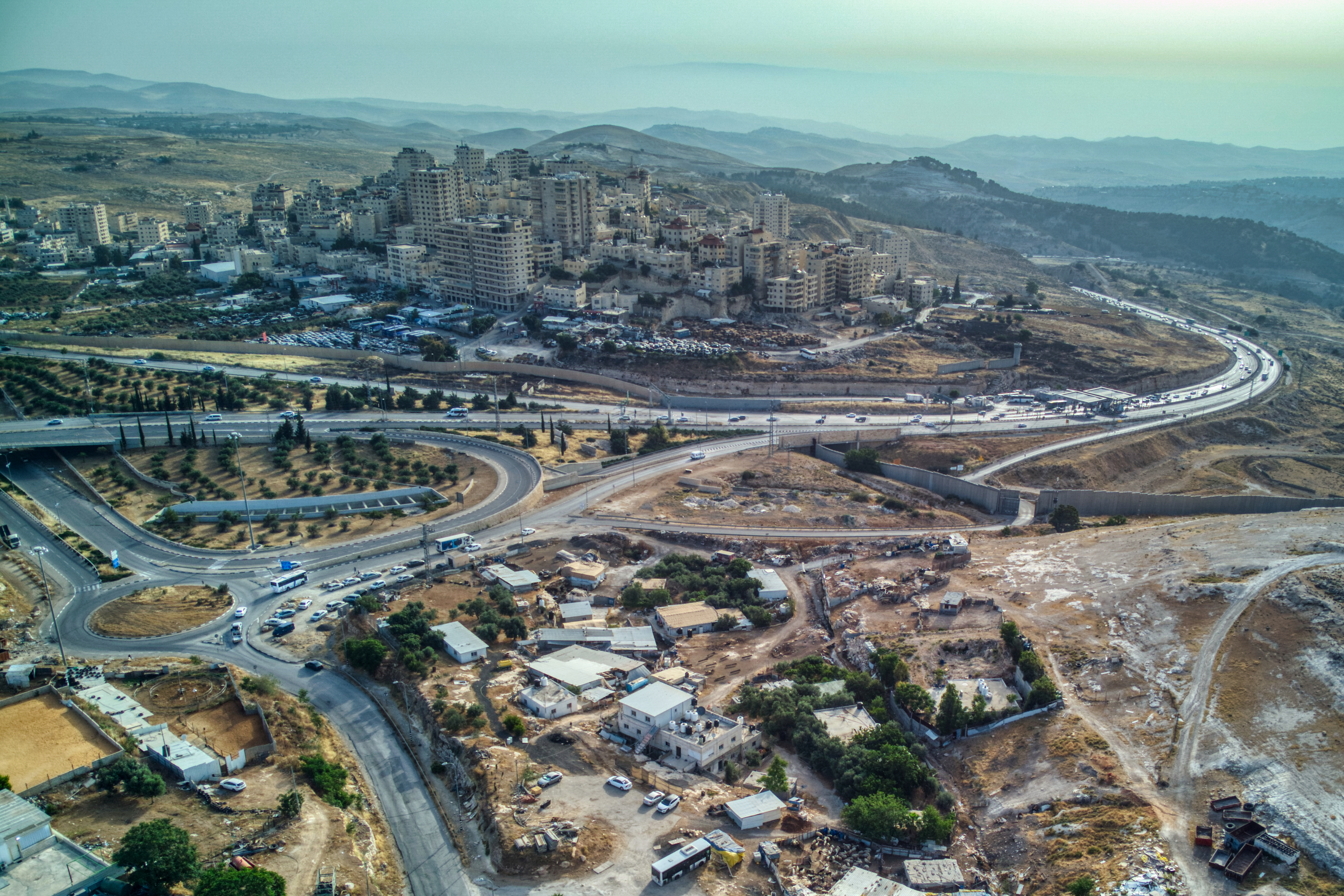
- Az-Za'ayyem and Az-Za'ayyem checkpoint, from the air

- Location of az-Za'ayyem within Palestine
- Coordinates: 31°47′16.41″N 35°15′54.11″E
- State: State of Palestine
- Governorate: Quds

Government
  - Type: Village council

Population (2017)
  - Total: 6,270

az-Za'ayyem (Arabic: الزعیّم) is a Palestinian village in the Jerusalem Governorate, located 3 kilometers east of Jerusalem in the central West Bank. According to the Palestinian Central Bureau of Statistics, the village had a population of 6,270 in 2017. The healthcare facilities for az-Za'ayyem according to the Ministry of Health are obtained in East Jerusalem.

== History ==
=== 1967, aftermath ===
After the 1967 Six-Day War, az-Za'ayyem has been under Israeli occupation.

After the 1995 accords, 3.8% (or 236 dunams) of the land was classified as Area B, the remaining 96.2% (or 5,896 dunams) as Area C.

Israel has confiscated land from az-Za'ayyem in order to construct two Israeli settlements:

- 406 dunams for Ma’ale Adumim,
- 138 dunams for Mishor Adumim (industrial zone).

Az-Za'ayyem lies close to Highway 1 to Jerusalem and the az-Za'ayyem check point in the separation barrier.

In December 2025 three residential buildings and eight agricultural buildings were destroyed by Israeli authorities leaving 31 residents homeless.
