= E1 (West Bank) =

Area of the West Bank northeast of East Jerusalem

Coordinates: 31°48′4.00″N 35°16′54.00″E

E1 מְבַשֶּׂרֶת אֲדֻמִּים مخطط إي 1
- Settlement residential development area
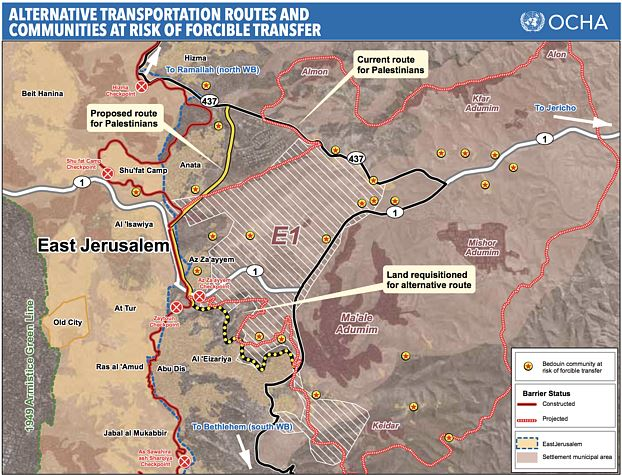
- Map showing location of and access to E1 area
- Interactive map of E1

Area
  - Total: 12 km^{2} (4.6 sq mi)

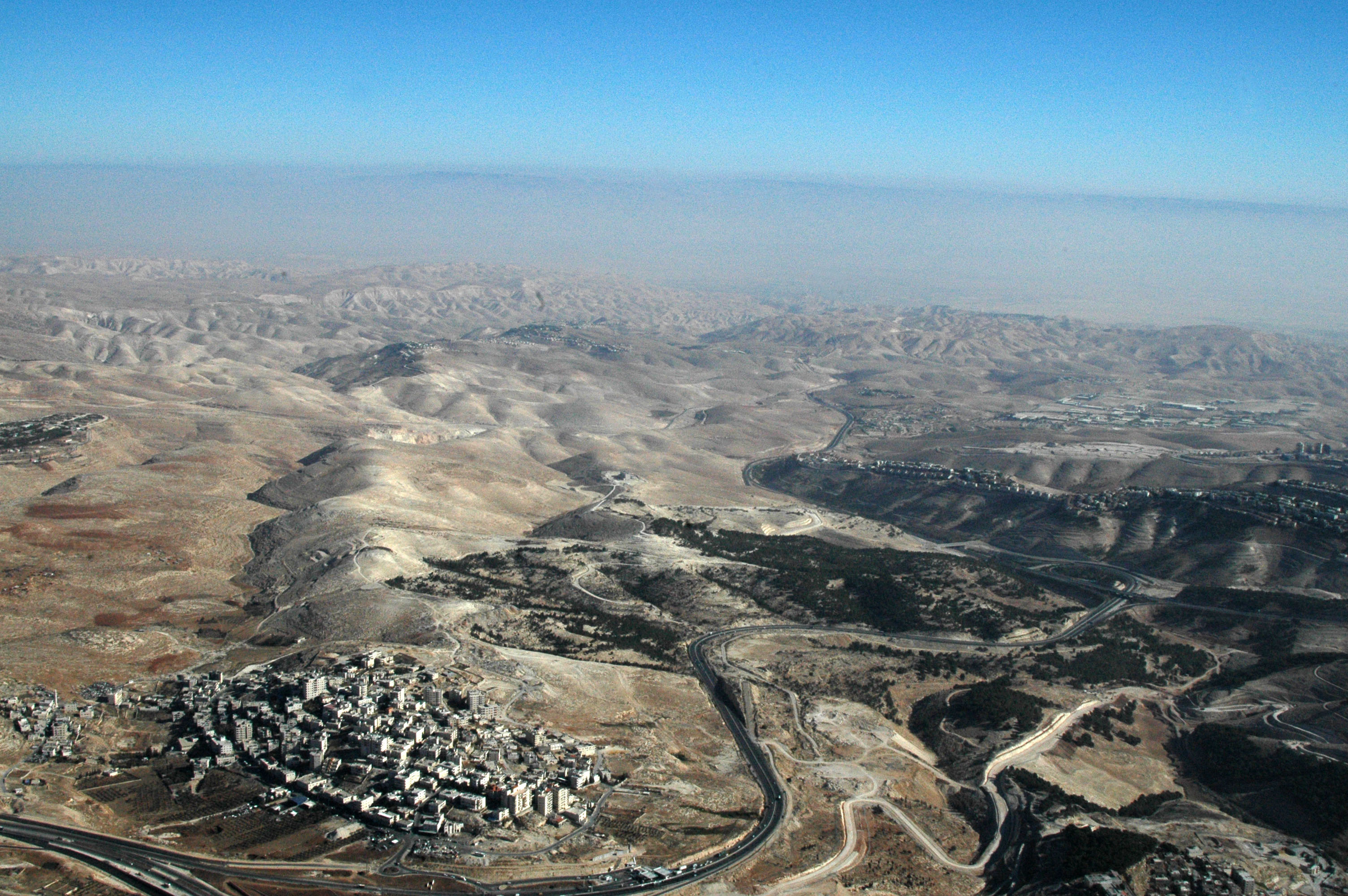
The project is to cover the entire wooded area between the Palestinian village of Az-Za'ayyem (bottom left) and the Israeli settlement of Ma'ale Adumim (right of the image)

E1 (short for "East 1"; Hebrew: מְבַשֶּׂרֶת אֲדֻמִּים, romanized: Mevaseret Adumim, lit. 'Herald of Adumim'), also called the E1 area, E1 zone or E1 corridor, is an area of the Israeli-occupied West Bank within the municipal boundary of the Israeli settlement of Ma'ale Adumim. It is located adjacent to and northeast of East Jerusalem and to the west of Ma'ale Adumim. It covers an area of 12 square kilometres (4.6 sq mi), which is home to a number of Bedouin communities including the village of Khan al-Ahmar. The national headquarters of the Israel Police is also located there.

The area is politically significant due to plans formalized in 1999 to create an Israeli urban contiguity joining Ma'ale Adumim and Jerusalem. The E1 project would complete a crescent of Israeli settlements physically separating East Jerusalem from the West Bank, jeopardizing the prospects of a contiguous Palestinian state. When Finance Minister Bezalel Smotrich approved construction plans for 3,400 new homes in August 2025, he spoke of "burying the Two-state solution". Israeli PM Benjamin Netanyahu employed the same rationale, adding that the land belonged to Israel. According to opponents of the plan, it also aims to prevent expansion of East Jerusalem. Palestinians have described the E1 plan as an effort to Judaize Jerusalem.

The international community considers Israeli settlements in the West Bank illegal under international law, but the Israeli government disputes this.

== Geography and plan ==
Situated in the West Bank, the E1 area is bordered by the French Hill neighborhood of Jerusalem to the west, Abu Dis to the southwest, Kedar to the south, Ma'ale Adumim to the east, and Almon to the north. The area is mountainous and covers almost 3,000 acres. The E1 area runs between the easternmost edges of annexed East Jerusalem and nearby Ma'ale Adumim, a large Israeli settlement located East of the pre-1967 green line. E1 falls within Area C of the West Bank, under full Israeli military and civilian control, and is administered by Ma'ale Adumim.

The plan for the E1 area within the municipal boundary of Ma'ale Adumim, sought to develop the area in order to link Ma'ale Adumim and its 40,000 residents to Jerusalem. It entails building about 3,500-15,000 housing units, the now-completed police headquarters of the Judea and Samaria district, as well as a large industrial zone, tourism, and commercial areas. Also a garbage dump and a large cemetery to be shared by Jerusalem and Ma'ale Adumim.

The proposed construction of a further new road around the settlement of Kedar in 2009 was also seen as attempting to facilitate residential development in E1.

The disputed E1 area is located in the West Bank and spans the area between Jerusalem and the Israeli settlement of Ma'ale Adumim. The land in question comprises about 12,000 dunams, which is roughly 12 square kilometers (4.6 sq mi).

If the E1 plan is fully implemented Palestinians could, theoretically, travel between the northern and southern West Bank via a road that at this time does not exist, looping around the Ma'ale Adumim bloc and the expanded area of Jerusalem. There have also been suggestions for an alternate road route for Palestinians running north–south between Ma'ale Adumim and Jerusalem that uses overpasses and tunnels to bypass Israeli settlements.

== Timeline ==
During the government of Yitzhak Shamir in 1991 part of the area currently known as E1 was transferred to the Ma'ale Adumim local council. In January 1994, the Higher Planning Council of Judea and Samaria's Subcommittee for Settlement tabled a new plan that expanded the municipal plan for Ma'ale Adumim and, in effect, constituted the basis for the future E1 Plan. Yitzhak Rabin expanded the borders of Ma'ale Adumim to include the area known as E1 and instructed Housing Minister Binyamin Ben Eliezer to begin planning a neighborhood at the location. Rabin, however, refrained from implementing any construction in the E1 area. From then on, planning and authorization procedures for the E1 neighborhood were promoted but were never totally completed, given the diplomatic constraints.

E1 lies within Area C, where Israel retained the powers of zoning and planning. Despite long-standing plans for the municipality of Ma'aleh Adumim to build 3000 new housing units on the E1 territory, Israel undertook unilateral limitations upon itself in this area.

Since Yitzhak Rabin every Israeli prime minister has supported the plan to create Israeli urban contiguity between Ma'ale Adumim and Jerusalem.

On 13 March 1996, Prime Minister Shimon Peres reaffirmed the government's position that Israel will demand applying Israeli sovereignty over Ma'aleh Adumim in the framework of a permanent peace agreement. Yossi Beilin, a dovish politician and co-author of the Geneva Initiative, supported annexing Ma'aleh Adumim. According to a document of understandings between former minister Yossi Beilin and Mahmoud Abbas from the mid-1990s, while some Jerusalem Arab neighborhoods were to be transferred to a future Palestinian state, Israel was to annex the Jewish communities around Jerusalem, such as Ma'ale Adumim, Givat Zeev, Beitar, and Efrat. According to the Clinton outline for partitioning Jerusalem that arose in the talks between Israel and the Palestinian Authority at the 2000 Camp David Summit, Israel was to be compensated for partitioning the city by annexing Ma'ale Adumim.

During the Ehud Barak government, the Prime Minister expressed support for E1 but refrained from undertaking any construction in the E1 area. Barak did place the issue of E1 on the negotiating table at Taba and the matter remained unresolved when the Taba talks broke up.

In 2002, Binyamin Ben-Eliezer the Minister of Defense signed the Master Plan for E1 (expedited, but not approved under Netanyahu administration) into law. Ben Eliezer subsequently pledged to the U.S. administration not to implement the E1 plan, and indeed no further statutory planning was carried out and there was no construction in E1 during his tenure in office.

In mid-2004, construction commenced on infrastructure in E1. The work was carried out by the Ministry of Construction and was illegal: in the absence of a Specific Town Plan, no permits could be or were issued to allow for this work. The work included the clearing of roads for major highways leading to the planned residential areas and site preparation for the planned police station which would also incorporate the police station in Ras Al Amud which would be transferred there.

During the 2007 Annapolis Conference, then-prime minister Ehud Olmert and then-foreign minister Tzipi Livni demanded that Ma'aleh Adumim remain a part of Israel. During the Netanyahu government, the Prime Minister attempted to expedite the E1 Master Plan. A first statutory step to implementation of the plan, which includes general land designations but is not specific enough to allow the issuance of building permits, was undertaken, along with the establishment of a Greater Jerusalem umbrella municipality which was to include Ma'ale Adumim. Netanyahu's also declared that "the State of Israel will continue to build in Jerusalem and in all the places on the state's strategic map" is a continuation of the political tradition that views control over E1 as a cardinal Israeli interest.

Since 2008, the headquarters of the Judea and Samaria district of the Israeli Police Department are situated in the E1.

In December 2012, in response to the United Nations approving the Palestinian bid for "non-member observer state" status, Israel announced the next day that it was resuming planning and zoning work in E1 area. EU ministers expressed their "dismay" and five European countries summoned Israeli ambassadors to protest.

The Palestinian tent site of Bab al Shams, which was established for several days in early 2013, also lay within this area.

The Netanyahu government restarted work on the Eastern Ring Road (Route 4370) after it was frozen for many years because of its relationship to E1 and on 9 January 2019, the first section was opened.

On 25 February 2020, Netanyahu announced the promotion of the equally frozen construction plans for E1, met with EU condemnation on 28 February.

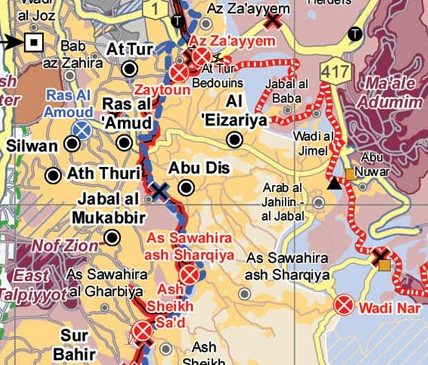
Al-Azariya is a Palestinian enclave surrounded by the Israeli West Bank barrier to the north, east and west.

Then Defense Minister Naftali Bennett announced on 9 March 2020, the approval of a new road which would connect with Route 4370 near az-Za'ayyem just east of Jerusalem, and run to areas near Al-Azariya and 'Arab al-Jahalin and intended to separate Palestinians and Israelis driving in the area. Currently, in order to cross the Adumim bloc, Palestinians need to drive on Route 1. The construction of this road is seen as a major step toward settlement building in E1.

On 31 July 2020, the European Union and 15 European countries expressed their grave concerns regarding the advancement of settlement construction in Givat HaMatos and potentially in the E1 area. In 2021 Twenty-six House Democrats urged U.S. Secretary of State Antony Blinken to pressure the Israeli government to prevent settlement construction in the E1 area between Jerusalem and the West Bank. At the beginning of July 2022, Twenty-nine Democrats, in the run-up to a scheduled visit to Israel by US President Joe Biden, again called for the Biden administration to prevent the construction of a "doomsday" settlement between Jerusalem and the West Bank that critics say threatens the creation of a contiguous Palestinian state. On 4 July 2022, Israeli authorities delayed a hearing to advance the project until 12 September.

In August 2025, Israel approved a plan to construct 3,401 new housing units in the area. In announcing the approval, Prime Minister Benjamin Netanyahu and Finance Minister Bezalel Smotrich openly stated that the intention was to prevent the establishment of a Palestinian state. As part of the plan, tenders for the construction of 1,234 new housing units were issued on 18 August 2026. This drew widespread condemnation from Israel's European allies. Human Rights Watch called on states to impose sanctions, the United Kingdom threatened do so, and other European countries were reported to be considering similar steps.

In September 2026, UK Foreign Secretary Ed Miliband announced that its global human rights sanctions regime would be extended to “enable swifter action to deter settlement expansion”. France and Canada announced their own measures in concert with those of the UK. Millibrand noted that the measures brought the UK, France, and Canada into alignment with the policies of the Netherlands, Ireland, Belgium, Spain and Norway, and that Denmark, Finland, Iceland, Poland, Portugal and Sweden "will support further action."

Following these remarks by Millibrand, United Kingdom Parliamentary under-secretary of state Stewart Wood said that the changes would be brought into force “in the next few weeks”. The UK government also set out further sanctions against settlers alleged to have supported or incited violence against Palestinians, bringing the total number of individuals sanctioned to 38.

== Objectives ==
The Israeli government says that the E1 plan is critical to Israeli national security interests and poses no threat to the formation of a continuous Palestinian state in the West Bank. Israeli military officials claim that E1 is necessary for Israel to possess defensible borders, primarily for the protection of the capital, Jerusalem. Despite his conservative background, many Israelis accused the Prime Minister, Benjamin Netanyahu, of holding back settlement plans in a bid to please the Obama administration.

According to the Palestinian presidential chief of staff, Rafiq Husseini, "The E1 plan would separate the northern and southern West Bank from East Jerusalem, which would prevent the establishment of Palestinian state". However, an area 12 miles wide between Ma'Ale Adumim and the Jordan River would still exist under Palestinian control, according to Olmert's 2008 offer and Israel's offer at the Camp David Summit. The E-1 plan does not geographically prohibit those offers from being implemented.

Though critics say that the plan is intended to cut off Palestinian neighborhoods of East Jerusalem from the rest of the West Bank, Palestinian neighborhoods like Abu Dis in East Jerusalem would still have access to the West Bank. Once the E1 plan is implemented, Palestinians will be able to travel from Bethlehem to Ramallah by going around Ma'ale Adumim. The Israeli government offered in 2008 under then Israeli premiere Ehud Olmert to build a road as part of a comprehensive settlement connecting Bethlehem and Ramallah, but the Palestinians rejected it.

== Controversy ==
=== Contiguity ===
Palestinians say that E1 development would prevent contiguity between the northern and southern areas of the West Bank making "the creation of a contiguous Palestinian state almost impossible" and increase travel time between Ramallah region north of Jerusalem to the Bethlehem region to the south. This would make it harder to reach agreement over permanent borders. The United States, EU and UN have supported the Palestinian position and has sought to block Israeli construction at the site, pending a final peace agreement. According to the UN and EU, construction in this area will deal a "fatal blow" to the two-state solution and make it "almost inconceivable". Israeli governments have so far avoided construction in E1 due to international pressure.

To address Palestinian concerns, Israel constructed a series of bypass roads that allow access from East Jerusalem to the West Bank. The total cost of construction was estimated in 2009 as amounting to ₪200,000,000 (approx. US$50,000,000) for the previous two years. The building of this infrastructure was interpreted as motivated by a desire to "claim" the E1 area ahead of constructing residential neighborhoods.

=== International opposition ===
Israel claims that E1 plans have been regarded as strategically important for Jerusalem's security by all of Israel's former Prime Ministers since Prime Minister Rabin appended E1 to Ma'ale Adumim. According to Ma'ale Adumim Mayor Bennie Kashriel, E1 is needed to allow continuous natural growth in Ma'ale Adumim, and is essential for Ma'ale Adumim's security. Without it, Ma'ale Adumim is detached from Jerusalem – which is a 12-minute car ride away, and is vulnerable to anyone who seizes the E1 range. Ma'ale Adumim has been compared to Mount Scopus, an Israeli enclave from 1948 to 1967.

Israel claims that it has the legal authority to build in the area and that the PA had agreed to a bypass road in the past.

Opposition to the plan has been voiced by lawyers and activists, including those associated with Peace Now. The United States has historically opposed the plan, with Israel stopping its construction under pressure of the Bush Administration. In 2009, Israel reached an understanding with the United States government that it would not build in the E1 zone, but announced its intention to build 3,000 new housing units there in 2012 on the grounds that the agreement was no longer relevant because the Palestinian Authority had "fundamentally violated" its prior agreements.

Israel's 2012 plan to move ahead with construction of 3,000 housing units faced international opposition. In particular, the European Union put strong diplomatic pressure on Israel to reverse its decision, and Britain and France threatened to withdraw their ambassadors.

In 2013, the Palestinian Authority threatened to refer the situation to the International Criminal Court.

=== Bedouin communities ===
At least eighteen Bedouin tribes have their homes in E1. These include the Jahalin Bedouin who state they resided in the E1 area since the 1950s with the consent of the landowners from Abu Dis and al-Eizariya, whereas the Israel claimed that it was only around the year 1988 that groups of the Jahalin tribe began to settle there and on adjacent lands.

Israeli efforts to remove the Jahalin Bedouin who live on the E1 lands have also been interpreted as preparing the ground for settlement construction. The European Union submitted a formal protest to the Israeli Foreign Ministry over evacuating Bedouin and tearing down Palestinians' houses in the E1 area in December 2011. Israel denied that such evacuations were a preparation for settlement construction.

In February 2012, Israeli authorities abandoned plans to resettle the Jahalin Bedouin to the Abu Dis garbage dump, but confirmed their intention to concentrate them in one location, which would be contrary to their traditional nomadic lifestyle, based on animals grazing. On 16 September 2014 it was announced that they would be moved to a new area in the Jordan Valley north of Jericho.

=== Bab al Shams ===
On 11 January 2013, a group of about 250 Palestinian and foreign activists saying that they wanted to establish "facts of the ground" moved into the area to erect a tent site, which they wanted to develop into a village called Bab al-Shams. Following a supreme court ruling and less than 48 hours after beginning protest the activists were forcibly evacuated, but the tent site was left for six days while the issue of its removal was being discussed.
