= Ma'ale Adumim =

Illegal Israeli settlement in the West Bank

Coordinates: 31°46′30″N 35°17′53″E

Ma'ale Adumim: מַעֲלֵה אֲדֻמִּים, מעלה אדומים; معالي أدوميم
- City (from 1991)

Hebrew transcription(s)
  - ISO 259: Maˁle ʔadummim
  - Also spelled: Ma'ale Adummim (official)
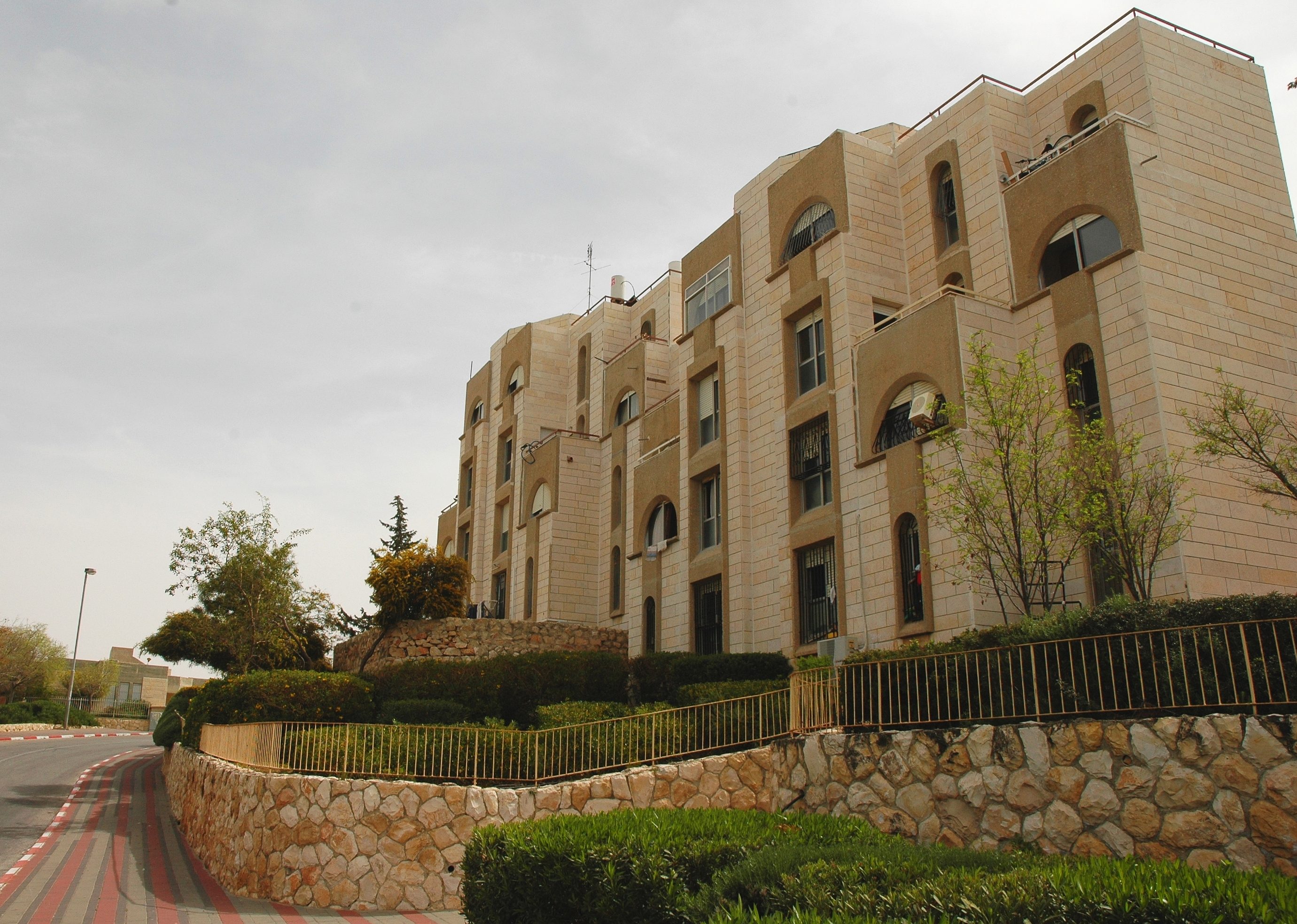

- Interactive map of Ma'ale Adumim
- Location within the West Bank
- Country: West Bank (de facto Israeli-occupied)
- District: Judea and Samaria Area
- Founded: 21 September 1975

Government
  - Mayor: Guy Yifrah

Area
  - Total: 49,177 dunams (49.177 km^{2}; 18.987 sq mi)

Population (2024)
  - Total: 35,846
  - Density: 728.92/km^{2} (1,887.9/sq mi)
- Name meaning: Red ascent

Ma'ale Adumim (Hebrew: מַעֲלֵה אֲדֻמִּים; Arabic: معالي أدوميم) is an urban Israeli settlement organized as a city council in the West Bank, seven kilometers (4 1/2 miles) east of Jerusalem. Ma'ale Adumim achieved city status in 1991. In 2015, its population was 35,846. It is located along Highway 1, which connects it to Jerusalem and the Tel Aviv Metropolitan Area. The international community considers Israeli settlements in the West Bank illegal under international law, but the Israeli government disputes this.

== Etymology ==
The town name Ma'ale Adumim is taken from two mentions made of an area marking the boundaries between two Israelite tribes in the Book of Joshua. At 15:7, in a passage on the inheritance of the Tribe of Judah, it is stated that part of the boundary ran from Debir to Gilgal, facing the ascent of Adumim, which the text places south of the wadi. At 18:17, in a description of the inheritance by the casting of lots that fell to Tribe of Benjamin, it is stated that part of its boundaries ran from En-shemesh then to Geliloth, which likewise faced the ascent of Adummim.

The toponym literally means 'Red Ascent' or 'Bloody Ascent' (Note: This is the Arabic meaning, traditionally thought to carrying the idea of the blood of travelers spilt by bandits who waylaid them on this area of their route.) referring to the hue of the exposed red limestone rocks, tinted by iron oxide, that in patches line the ascent from the Dead Sea towards Jerusalem.

== History ==
=== First displacement of Bedouin tribes ===
The Jahalin and Sawahareh Bedouin tribes, evicted by Israel from their traditional pastoral lands in the Tel Arad area of the Negev, settled in the area of what would become the Ma'ale Adumim municipality, then under Jordanian administration, after contracting with local Palestinian landowners and receiving permission to graze their livestock there. After the Israeli conquest and occupation of the West Bank in the Six-Day War in 1967, they were gradually hemmed in by restrictions, due to pressures from the development of the Israeli settlement, many ending up in tracts of land in the vicinity of the Jericho-Jerusalem road or a rubbish dump near Abu Dis.

=== Initiation of Israeli settlement ===
As early as 1968, just after the Six-Day War, Yigal Allon had advanced a proposal to establish a settlement somewhere in the area of Ma'ale Adumim and Jericho. The government of Levi Eshkol did not implement the step, because the political and diplomatic implications were significant, in that it would effectively split the West Bank. It was later opposed by Yehiel Admoni, the then head of the Jewish Agency for Israel's Settlement Department, as lying outside the scope of the Allon Plan, and if the 'Red Ascent' were settled, it would further erode what land might remain over for restoring territory to the Palestinians in a future peace negotiation.

The idea of making an industrial park for Jerusalem in the area of Ma'ale Adumim had been circulating for some years. In August 1974, Yisrael Galili, a major presence in the settlement project together with Meir Zorea with strong connections to Gush Emunim, aired the idea of settling it. He had privately offered it as a recompense for settlers who had attempted to establish themselves in Sebastia, to be rebuffed when that group refused to compromise. The links with Gush Emunim attested to a growing impact of Religious Zionist ideology on Israel's developing policies regarding the Palestinian territories. It is thought that the agreement to develop an industrial zone for Jerusalem there was the result of a deal struck between the National Religious Party and the government of Yitzhak Rabin, as part of a bargain between members of the coalition government, for which the green light was given on 24 November 1975. This government strategy to create "facts on the ground" was a response to the Rabat Summit decision in Morocco in October to recognize the PLO as the sole representative of the Palestinian people. It was decided to permit 25 residential units to house 100 Israeli settlers/workers.

=== Development of the settlement ===
Problems existed from the start, since there were no budget funds allocated for the project, and ministers opposed it either on financial grounds or out of suspicions that its creation had nothing to do with the establishment of an industrial town, but masked an intention to make a civilian settlement, something opposed by Mapam. Whatever monies were used, Yossi Sarid complained, would detract from funds targeted for Israel's own impoverished development towns. The evidence suggests that the decision was inspired more by political needs, including the perceived need to placate far-right groups, rather than respond to the requirements of the city of Jerusalem. Gershom Gorenberg argues that the cabinet compromise was 'a ruse' that spoke of setting up factory housing when in fact the aim was to create a fully fledged settlement afterwards. Galili himself argued that a settlement between Jericho and East Jerusalem was needed to keep Jordanians away from the Holy City. In an interview several decades later, the mayor of one of the larger settlements claimed that the aim of establishing Ma'ale Adumim was to 'protect Jerusalem from Arabs' and secure the road to the Jordan Valley.

According to the Jerusalem Post, the site had served as a Nahal military outpost, before being designated to become an Israeli labourers' camp. The outpost's establishment was delayed for political reasons, despite the November decision. Yigal Allon was due to meet Henry Kissinger in Washington and any leak of a new settlement would have been inconvenient at that time. Galili said the timing for the setting up of camps on the site should coincide with Kissinger's movements, timing it so that the latter's shuttle diplomacy would find him in transit to Brussels. Finally, around March 1975, following a ministerial decree to expropriate 3,000 hectares of land from the area's Palestinian villages, forty members of Gush Emunim built a water tower and prefab concrete hut on the site, only to be evicted the same afternoon by Israeli troops, each prospective settler carried away by four soldiers. This site was thereafter called by the settlers "Founder's Circle". In 1977, Haim Sabato founded a hesder yeshiva (paramilitary field seminary) there and it was also designated to become a planned community, suburb and commuter town for nearby Jerusalem, to which many residents would commute daily.

The boundaries of the settlement were set at some 3,500 hectares in 1979 and by the early 90s had extended to 4,350 hectares. Writing in 2003, Cheryl Rubenberg stated that

For the bedouins, as well as for the villagers, loss of their lands meant loss of their agricultural way of life and major transformations in their social life. Today, the area available to the villages together, with a population of approximately 40,000, is some 460 hectares. The area of Ma'ale Adumim with some 26,000 settlers, is 11.5 times greater.

=== Displacement of Jahalin Bedouins in 1990s ===
In the late 1990s, approximately 1,050 Jahalin Bedouins were displaced from land that was now annexed to form part of the settlement. Sewage was used as a tool for displacement. The Israeli Civil Administration disconnected one of the sewage pipes of the Ma'ale Adumim settlement on the hilltop to flood large areas around the Bedouin camp on the lower slopes of the hill. Streams and ponds of polluted matter forced the tribe to relocate.

Court orders required compensation by the Israeli government and they received cash, electricity and water supplies. According to the residents, they had to sell most of their livestock and their Bedouin way of life was forcibly ended.

=== Attack and planned expansion ===
After Palestinian gunmen killed one Israeli and injured five Israelis near Ma'ale Adumim, Israel's far-right Finance Minister Bezalel Smotrich in February 2024 announced a "settlement response" after speaking to Prime Minister Benjamin Netanyahu and Defense Minister Yoav Gallant, as "any harm to us will lead to more construction and more development and more of our hold all over the country", with 2,350 more homes in Ma'ale Adumim being arranged for approval. American Secretary of State Antony Blinken criticized the announcement, stating that new Israeli settlements are "inconsistent with international law" and "counter-productive to reaching an enduring peace", risking "Israel’s security". Haaretz reported that Israel's government in March 2024 progressed the approval of 2,452 more settler homes in Ma'ale Adumim.

== Urban plans ==
The chief urban planner was architect Rachel Walden. In March 1979, Ma'ale Adumim achieved local council status. The urban plan for Ma'ale Adumim, finalized in 1983, encompasses a total of 35 square kilometres (13 1/2 sq mi), of which 3.7 km^{2} (1 7/16 sq mi) have been built so far, in a bloc that includes Ma'ale Adumim, Mishor Adumim, Kfar Adumim, and Allon.

== Politics ==
Guy Yifrah was elected mayor of Ma'ale Adumim at the 2024 Israeli municipal elections with 53 per cent of the vote.

According to Nathan Thrall:

Although the bloc itself is not officially annexed to Israel, Jewish immigrants from Los Angeles or London may move directly to it, or to any other settlement, and receive a basket of government aid that includes free air travel, a financial grant, subsistence allowances for one year, rent subsidies, low-interest mortgages, Hebrew instruction, tuition benefits, tax discounts, and reduced fees at state-recognized day care centers, of which the bloc contains several.

=== Voting patterns ===
In the 2022 election, 79 percent of voters in Ma'ale Adumim voted for the parties of the right-wing coalition led by Benjamin Netanyahu, while 18 percent voted for the parties of the center-left coalition led by Yair Lapid and 0.1 percent voted for the Arab parties.

In the 2026 election, 74 percent of voters in Ma'ale Adumim voted for the parties of the right-wing coalition led by Benjamin Netanyahu, while 19 percent voted for the parties of the center-left coalition led by Gadi Eisenkot and 0.06 percent voted for the Arab parties. An additional 3.2 percent voted for the Reservists, and 3.2 percent voted for Amcha Yisrael. Voter turnout increased 9 percent from the 2022 election.

== Geography ==
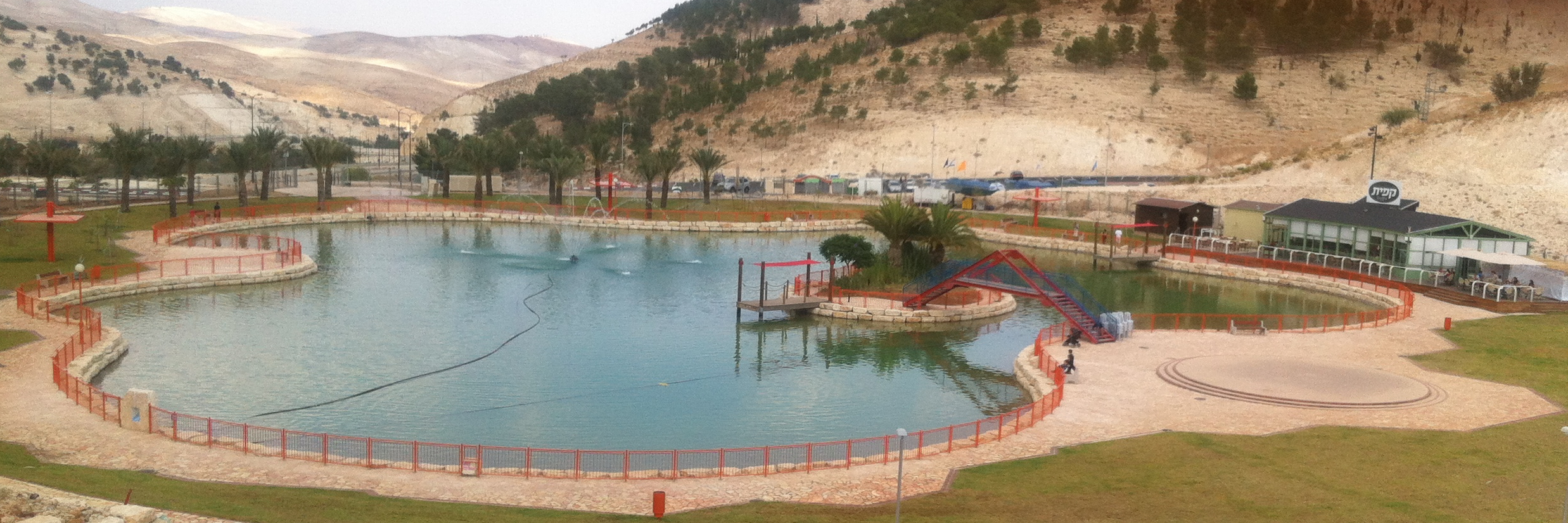
Artificial pond, Ma'ale Adumim

The city is surrounded on four sides by the Judean Desert and is linked to Jerusalem and the Tel Aviv Metropolitan Area via Highway 1. Due to its strategic location between the northern and southern parts of the West Bank, Palestinians see this as a threat to the territorial continuity of a future Palestinian state. This claim is disputed by mayor Benny Kashriel, who claims that continuity would be attained by circling Ma'ale Adumim to the east. Israeli drivers use a bypass road that exits the city to the west, entering Jerusalem through the French Hill Junction or a tunnel that goes under Mount Scopus. These routes were built in the wake of the First and Second Intifadas when Palestinian militants shot at motorists and cars were stoned. The previous road passed through al-Eizariya and Abu Dis.

== Economy ==
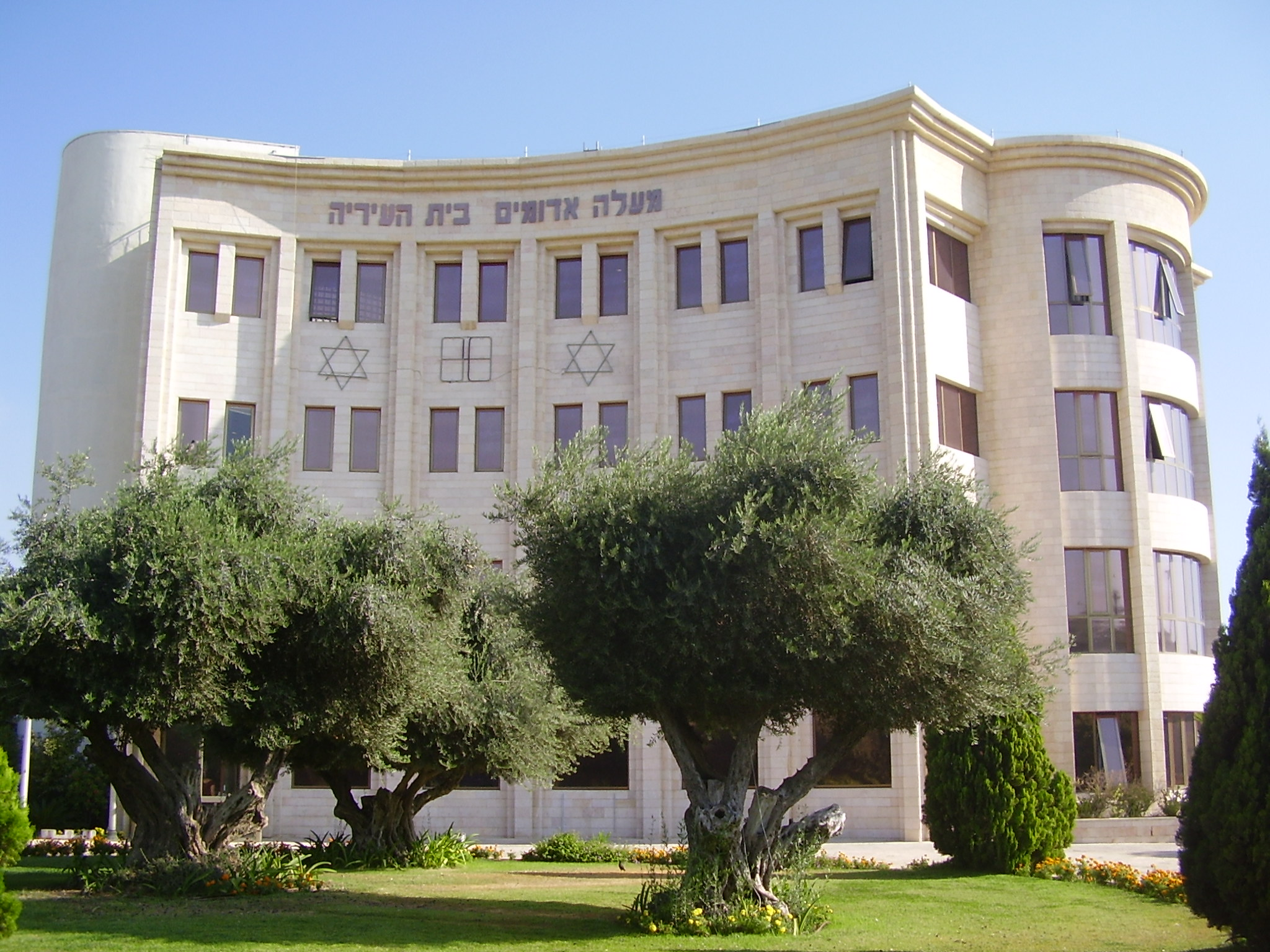
Ma'ale Adumim municipality

Many residents of Ma'ale Adumim are employed in Jerusalem. Others work in Mishor Adumim, Ma'ale Adumim's industrial park, which is located on the road to the Dead Sea, about ten minutes from Jerusalem. The industrial zone houses 220 businesses, among them textile plants, garages, food manufacturers, aluminum and metalworking factories, and printing companies.

== Demographics ==
In 2004, over 70 percent of the residents were secular. According to the municipal spokesman, the overwhelming majority moved to the city not for ideological reasons but for lower-cost housing and higher living standards. In 2004, 48 percent of residents were under the age of 18. Ma'aleh Adumim's unemployment rate was 2.1 percent, far below the national average.

== Education and culture ==
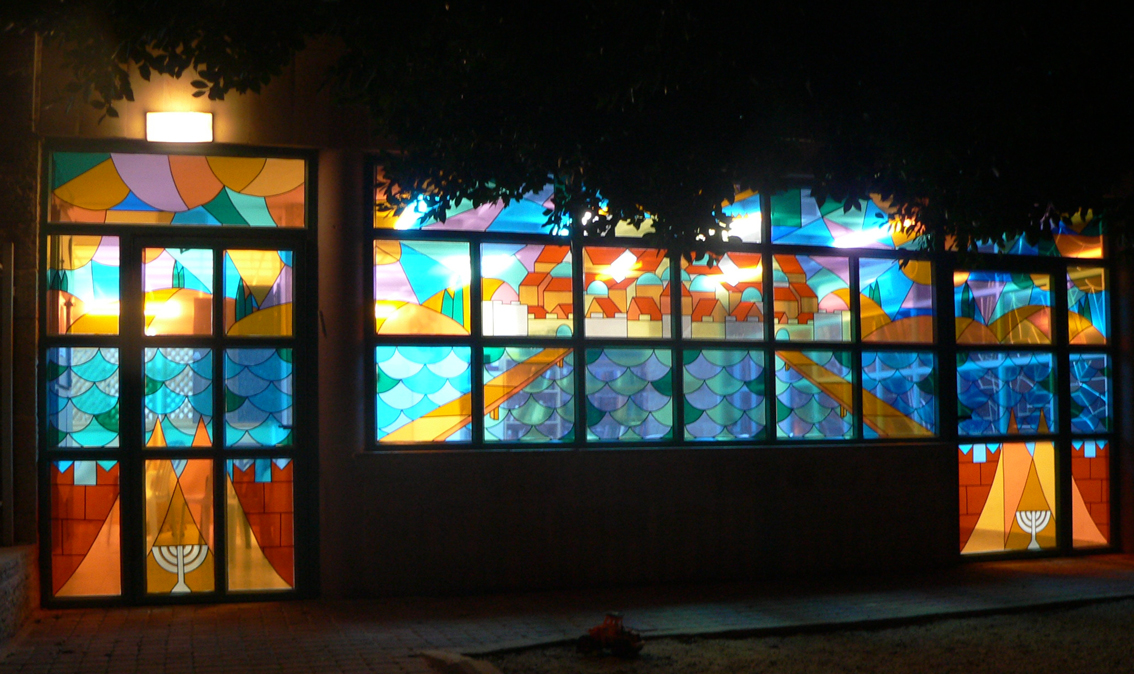
Alei Higayon BeKinnor (Machanaim) synagogue on Hallil Street

In 2011, Ma'ale Adumim had 21 schools and 80 kindergartens. A large portion of Ma'ale Adumim's budget is spent on education. Schools offer after-school programs, class trips, and tutoring, where needed. A special program has been developed for new immigrant children. Additional resources are invested in special education and classes for gifted children, including a special after-school program for honors students in science and math. Ma'ale Adumim College was situated in the city, but is currently defunct. Religious elementary schools in Ma'ale Adumim include Ma'aleh Hatorah, Sde Chemed, and Tzemach Hasadeh. Religious high schools are Yeshiva Tichonit, Tzvia and Amit. The city has over 40 synagogues and several yeshivas, among them Yeshivat Birkat Moshe. Ma'ale Adumim has won the Israel Ministry of Education prize for excellence twice. It has also won the national prize for environmental quality in recognition of its emphasis on urban planning, green space, playgrounds and outdoor sculptures.

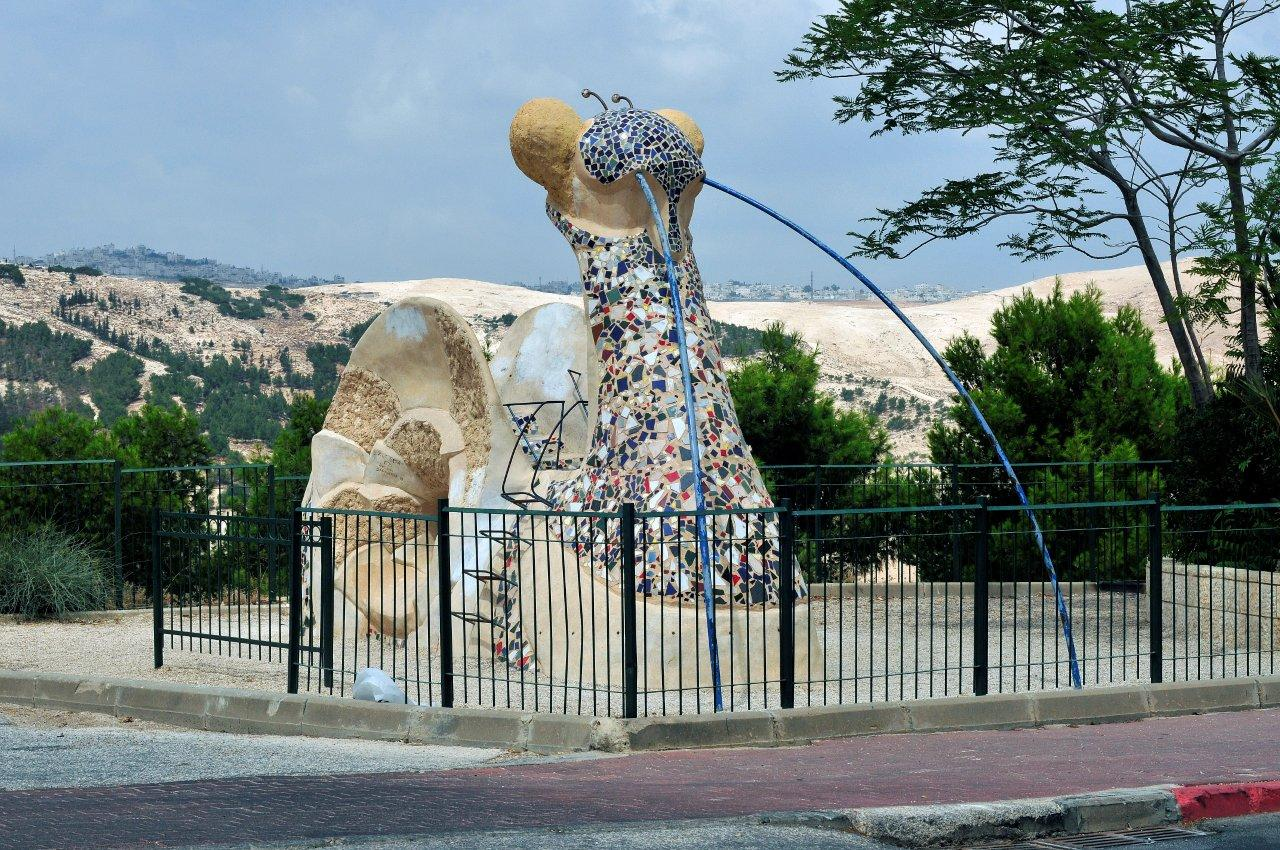
Children's park overlooking Judean Desert, Ma'ale Adumim

== Healthcare ==
Medical services are provided in the city through all four Health maintenance organizations (kupot holim). There is also a large geriatric hospital, Hod Adumim, providing care for recuperating patients and chronic patients. It is also used for senior citizens residence. It has facilities for nursing, the elderly, the handicapped, through the most extreme needs.

== Legality ==
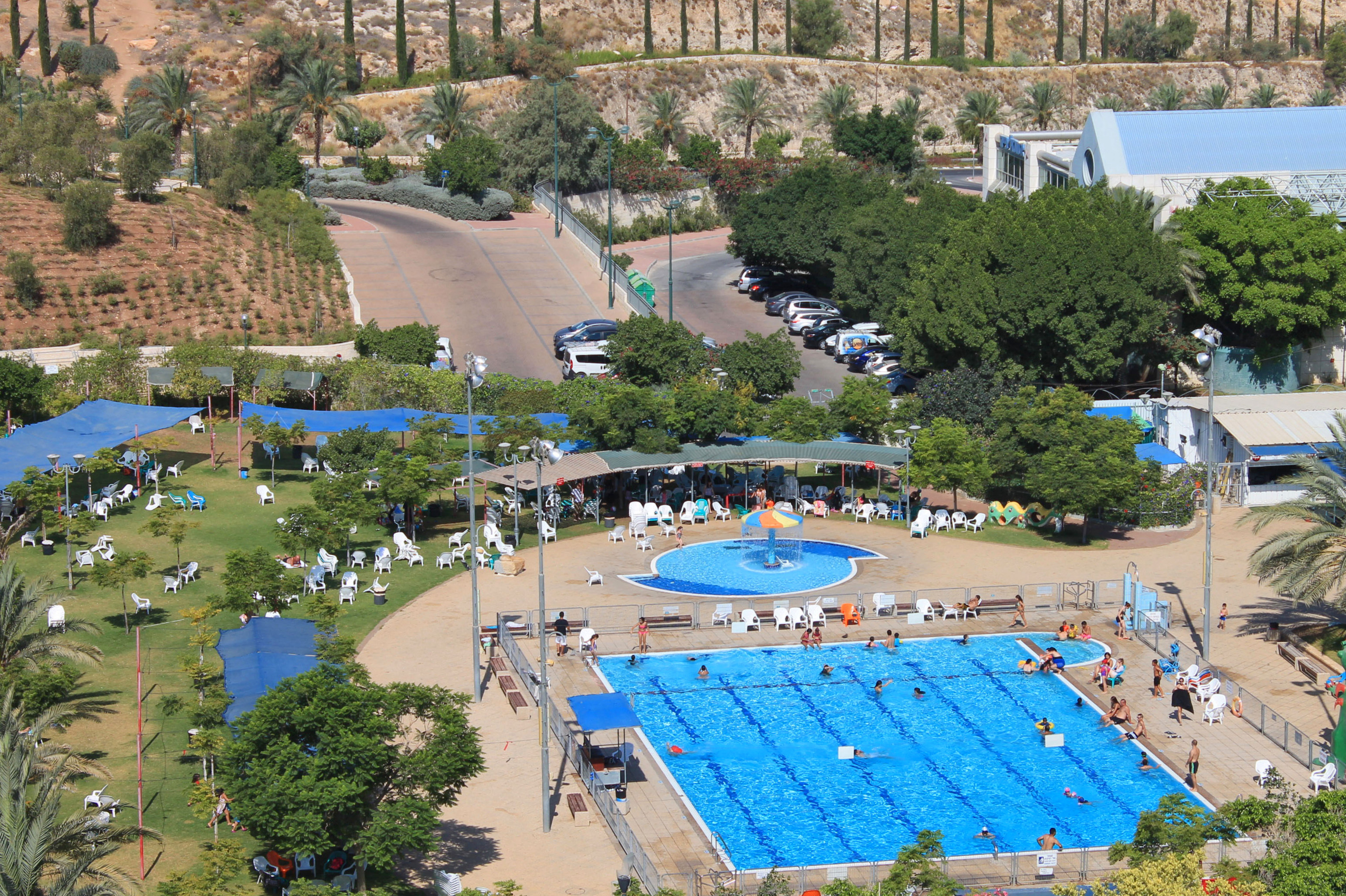
Aerial view

Map of the projected expansion of Ma'ale Adumim.

According to ARIJ, Israel confiscated land from the following Palestinian villages in order to construct Ma'ale Adumim:

- 4,217 dunams from al-Eizariya,
- 1,031 dunams from Abu Dis,
- 406 dunams from az-Za'ayyem,
- 2 dunams from Isawiya.

Peace Now, citing official government documents, stated that 0.5% of Ma'ale Adumim was privately owned Palestinian land. Israel asserts that Ma'ale Adumin was built on "state lands," or areas not registered in anyone's name, and that no private property was being seized for building. Palestinians say lands from the villages of Abu Dis, al-Eizariya, Al-Issawiya, At-Tur and 'Anata were expropriated for building in Ma'ale Adumim.

The Israeli human rights organisation B'Tselem criticizes: "The expropriation procedure used in Ma'ale Adummim is unprecedented in the settlement enterprise. Expropriation of land for settlement purposes is forbidden, not only under international law but also according to the long-standing, official position of Israeli governments. Most settlements were built on area that was declared state land or on land that was requisitioned – ostensibly temporarily – for military purposes. It appears that in Ma'ale Adummim, the government decided to permanently expropriate the land because it viewed the area as an integral part of Jerusalem that would forever remain under Israeli control."

In 2005, a report by John Dugard for the United Nations Commission on Human Rights stated that the "three major settlement blocs—Gush Etzion, Ma'ale Adumim and Ariel—will effectively divide Palestinian territory into cantons or Bantustans." Israel says the solution is a bypass road similar to those used daily by Israelis to avoid driving through hostile Arab areas. The 2007 development project in east Ma'ale Adumim was supported by Ariel Sharon in 2005. Israeli Foreign Ministry spokesman Mark Regev denied the 2007 extension plan is a violation of the roadmap peace plan, under which Israel agreed to freeze all building in the settlements.

In 2008, a project to link Ma'ale Adumim and Jerusalem, known as the E1 project—short for "East 1", as it appears on old zoning maps—was criticized by the Palestinian Authority, US Secretary of State Condoleezza Rice and US President George W. Bush. As a result, a plan for 3,500-5,000 homes in Mevaseret Adumim was frozen. The new Judea and Samaria District police headquarters, formerly located in the Ras el-Amud neighborhood of Jerusalem, was completed in May 2008.

Ma'ale Adumim is widely regarded by the international community as illegal under international law according to the Fourth Geneva Convention (article 49), which prohibits an occupying power transferring citizens from its own territory to occupied territory. Israel maintains that international conventions relating to occupied land do not apply to the West Bank because they were not under the legitimate sovereignty of any state in the first place. This view was rejected by the International Court of Justice and the International Committee of the Red Cross.

== Housing shortage ==
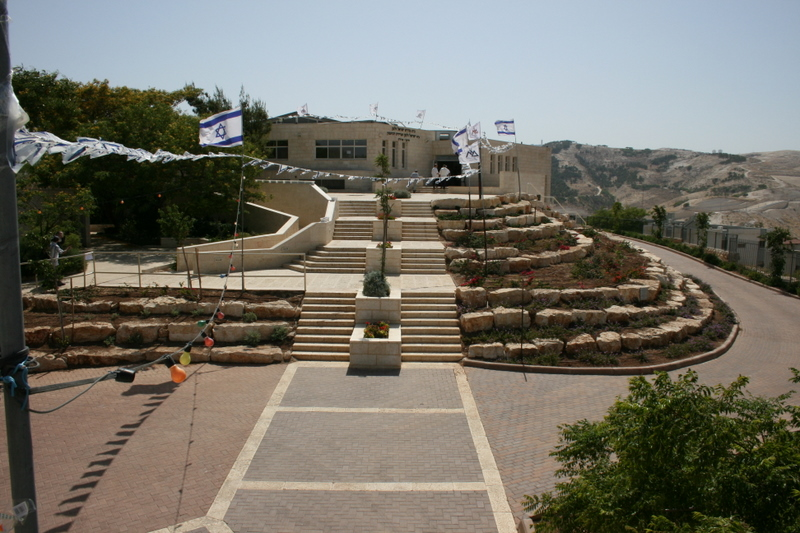
Ma'ale Adumim yeshiva

One of the purposes of establishing Ma'ale Adumim was to supply affordable housing for young couples who could not afford the high cost of homes in Jerusalem. Although the municipal boundaries cover 48,000 dunams, the city has been suffering from an acute housing shortage since 2009 due to the freeze on new construction. As of 2011 most of the real estate market was in second-hand properties.

== Archaeology ==
- The Byzantine monastery of Martyrius, once the most important monastic centre in the Judean Desert in the early Christian era, is located in Ma'ale Adumim.

Other archaeological sites on the outskirts of Ma'ale Adumim include:

- Khan el-Hatruri, also known as the Good Samaritan Inn (traditionally associated with an inn mentioned in a parable by Jesus, in Luke 10:30–37)
- The remains of the Monastery of St. Euthymius, built in the 5th century and destroyed by the Mamluk sultan Baybars. It is known in Arabic as Khan al-Ahmar, since the buildings were repurposed in the 13th-century as a caravanserai for Muslim pilgrims on the route between Jerusalem and Mecca via Nabi Musa.

== Landmarks ==
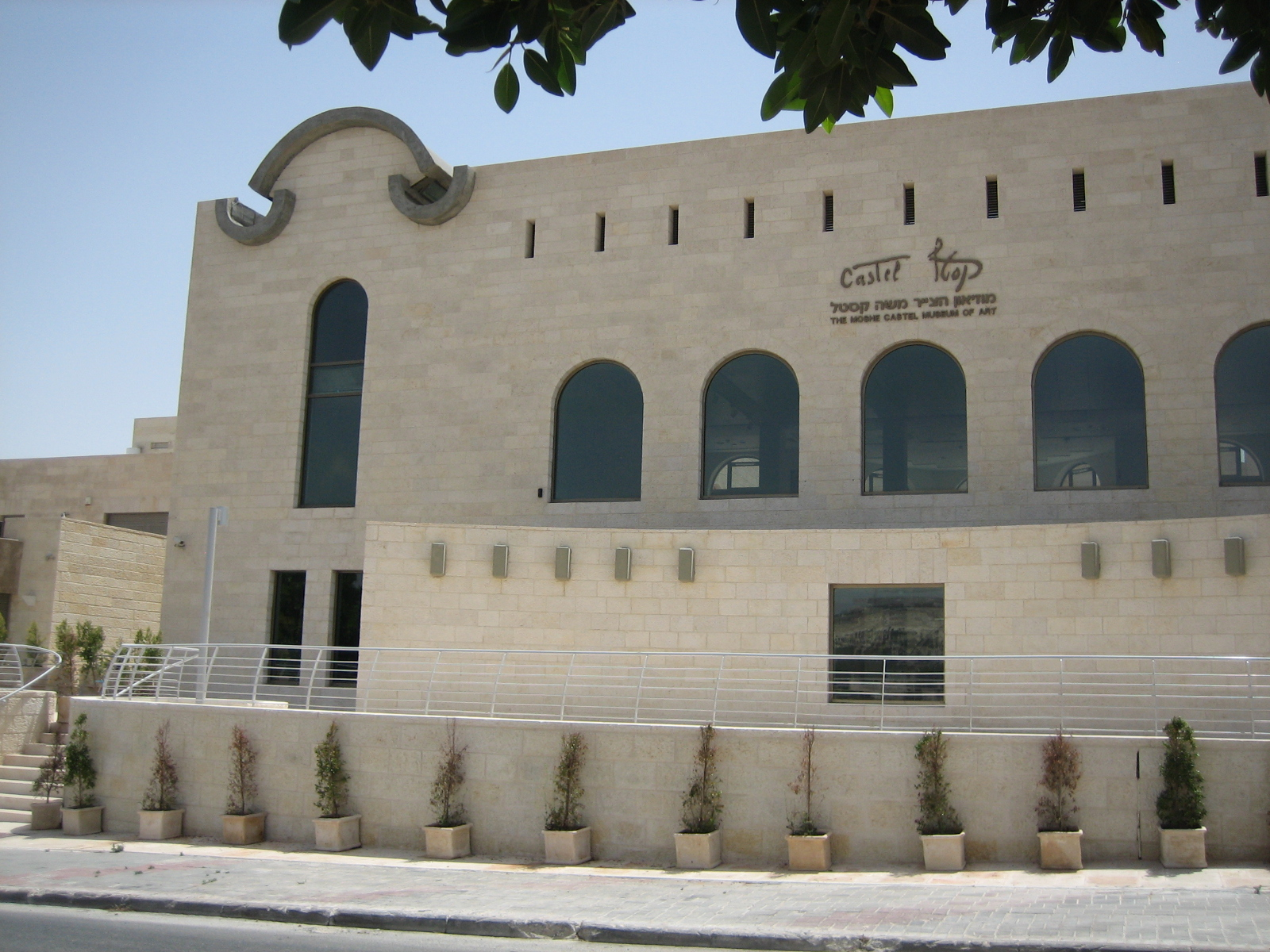
Moshe Castel Museum in Ma'ale Adumim

The Moshe Castel Museum showcases the work of Israeli artist Moshe Castel.

The Tree of Life is the world's largest artistic representation of an Olive Tree. The model for the tree was a five hundred year old Olive Tree from the Garden of Gethsemane. The Tree is the artistic creation of Jerusalem artist Sam Philipe. The site is a venue for outdoor programming and weddings.

Mizpe Edna is a lookout at the Shofar and Hallil junction.

== Sources ==
- Allegra, Marco (2017). "'Outside Jerusalem and Yet So Near': Ma'ale Adumim, Jerusalem, and the Suburbanization of Israel's Settlement Policy". In Ariel, Handel; Allegra, Marco; Maggor, Erez (eds.). Normalizing Occupation: The Politics of Everyday Life in the West Bank Settlements. Indiana University Press. pp. 48–63. ISBN 978-0-253-02505-0.
- Benzaquen, John (12 May 2011). "Neighborhood Watch: Unsettled market". Jerusalem Post.
- "Ma'ale Adumim Area". B'tselem. 16 November 2013.
- Ginbar, Yuval (July 1999). "On the Way to Annexation: Human Rights Violations Resulting from the Establishment and Expansion of the Ma'ale Adummim Settlement" (PDF). B'tselem.
- Gonen, Rivka (2000). Biblical Holy Places: An Illustrated Guide. Paulist Press. ISBN 978-0-809-13974-3.
- Gorenberg, Gershom (2006). The Accidental Empire:Israel and the Birth of the Settlements, 1967-1977. Henry Holt & Co. ISBN 9781466800540.
- Lustick, Ian S. (1988). For the Land and the Lord: Jewish Fundamentalism in Israel. Council on Foreign Relations. ISBN 978-0-876-09036-7.
- Leon, Nissim (2015). "The Significance of the Yom Kippur War as a Turning Point in the Religious-Zionist Society". In Lebel, Udi; Lewin, Eyal (eds.). The 1973 Yom Kippur War and the Reshaping of Israeli Civil–Military Relations. Lexington Books. pp. 37–53. ISBN 978-1-498-51372-2.
- Nissenbaum, Dion (2015). A Street Divided: Stories From Jerusalem's Alley of God. St. Martin's Press. ISBN 978-1-466-88489-2.
- McCarthy, Rory (24 August 2009). "How settlements in the West Bank are creating a new reality, brick by brick". The Guardian.
- O'Malley, Padraig (2015). The Two-State Delusion: Israel and Palestine--A Tale of Two Narratives. Penguin. ISBN 978-0-698-19218-8.
- Ranta, Ronald (2015). Political Decision Making and Non-Decisions: The Case of Israel and the Occupied Territories. Palgrave Macmillan. ISBN 978-1-137-44799-9.
- Rubenberg, Cheryl (2003). The Palestinians: In Search of a Just Peace. Lynne Rienner Publishers. ISBN 978-1-588-26225-7.
- Shalev, Nir (December 2009). "The Hidden Agenda: Establishment and Expansion Plans of Ma'ale Adummim and their Human Rights Ramifications" (PDF). B'tselem/Bimkom. pp. 1–58.
- Shlay, Anne B.; Rosen, Gillad (2015). Jerusalem: The Spatial Politics of a Divided Metropolis. John Wiley & Sons. ISBN 978-0-745-69600-3.
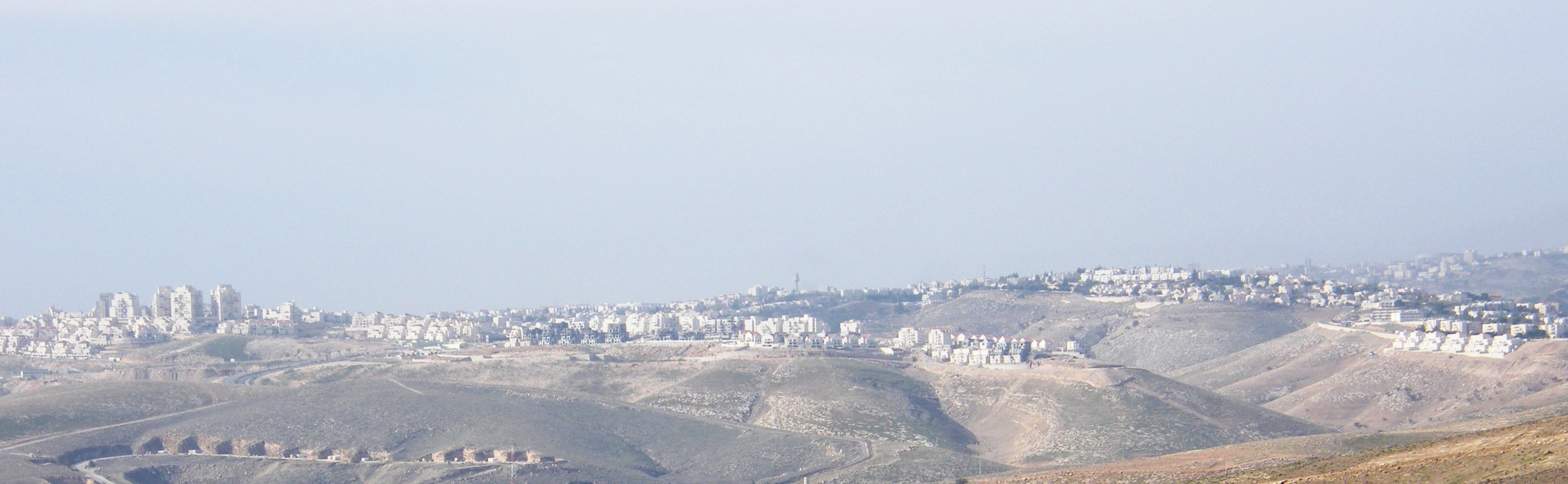
Panorama of Ma'ale Adumim
