= Khan al-Ahmar =

Khan al-Ahmar or Khan el-Ahmar, meaning "Red Caravanserai" in Arabic, frequently refers to

- Khan al-Ahmar (village), a Palestinian village of Jahalin Bedouin

and may also refer to two sites in the Adummim, West Bank area:

- Monastery of Euthymius, archaeological site of Byzantine monastery, later khan (caravanserai, inn) known in Arabic as Khan el-Ahmar
- Good Samaritan Inn, archaeological site of ancient inn known in Arabic as Khan al-Hatruri, occasionally as Khan el-Ahmar
