= Route 417 (Israel–Palestine) =

Road in Israel and Palestine

Coordinates: 31°46′56.05″N 35°14′20.04″E

Route 417
- כביש 417
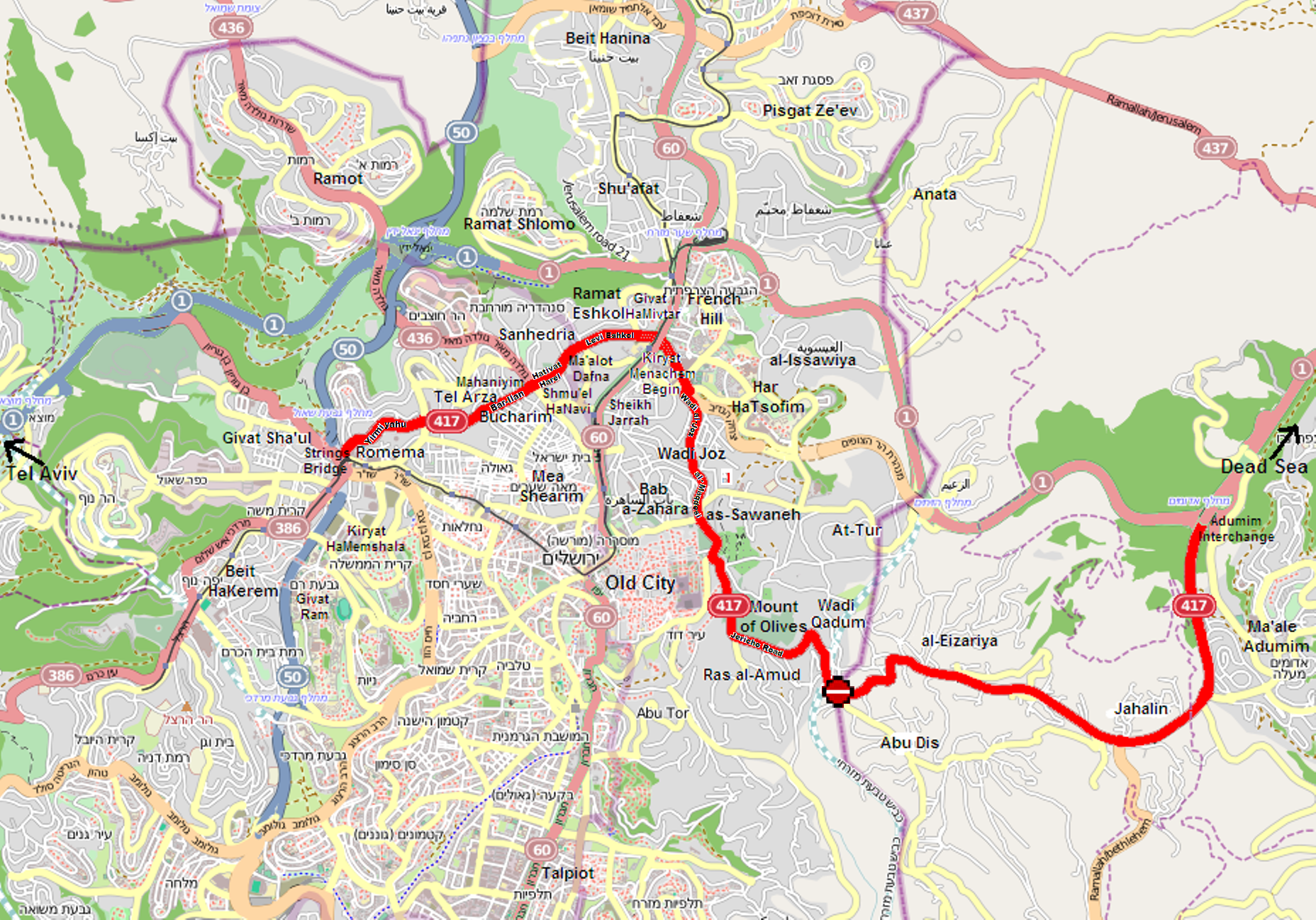

Route information
- Length: 16 km (9.9 mi)

Major junctions
- West end: Junction at Weizmann Blvd
- East end: Adumim Interchange

Location
- Country: Israel
- Major cities: Jerusalem (Givat Shaul, Romema, Shikun Chabad, Tel Arza, Bukharim, Mahanayim, Sanhedriya, Shmuel HaNavi, Sanhedriya, Ramat Eshkol, Ma'alot Dafna, Givat HaMivtar, Givat HaTahmoshet, Kiryat Menachem Begin, HaGiv'a HaTzarfatit, Har HaTsofim, Wadi al-Joz, Old City, al-Sawaneh, Har HaZeitim, Ras al-Amud, Ma'ale ha-Zeitim and Wadi Qadum) neighborhoods; Abu Dis; al-Eizariya; Jahalin; Kedar; Ma'ale Adumim

Highway system
- Roads in Israel; Highways

Route 417 (Hebrew: כביש 417, "Kvish Arba'-Achat-Sheva'") is an intercity road in Israel and the West Bank that stretches from the west side of Jerusalem to Ma'ale Adumim and Highway 1 east to the Jordan Valley.

== History ==
Most of the road serves as a local thoroughfare within Jerusalem and East Jerusalem. The road has been non-contiguous since the construction of the Israeli West Bank barrier through Abu Dis in 2006. Route 417 used to be the main route from the west to the Jordan Valley and the Dead Sea, bypassing downtown Jerusalem. With the opening of Jerusalem Road 9 (Yitzhak Shamir Road and Yigal Yadin Interchange) and the Ma'ale Adumim Road, the historic route lost that distinction. With the closure of the road in Abu Dis, the route no longer serves that option at all.

== Route ==
The route's name changes many times along the way. From west to east:

=== Yirmiyahu Street ===
Named after the biblical prophet, the route begins at Weizmann Boulevard at the base of the Strings Bridge, an area known historically as the western "Jerusalem Gate", the main entrance to the city from the west. It passes the beginning of Jaffa Road near the Jerusalem Central Bus Station and the headquarters of Magen David Adom. It then winds through the Romema neighborhood as a commercial and light-industrial four-lane divided boulevard.

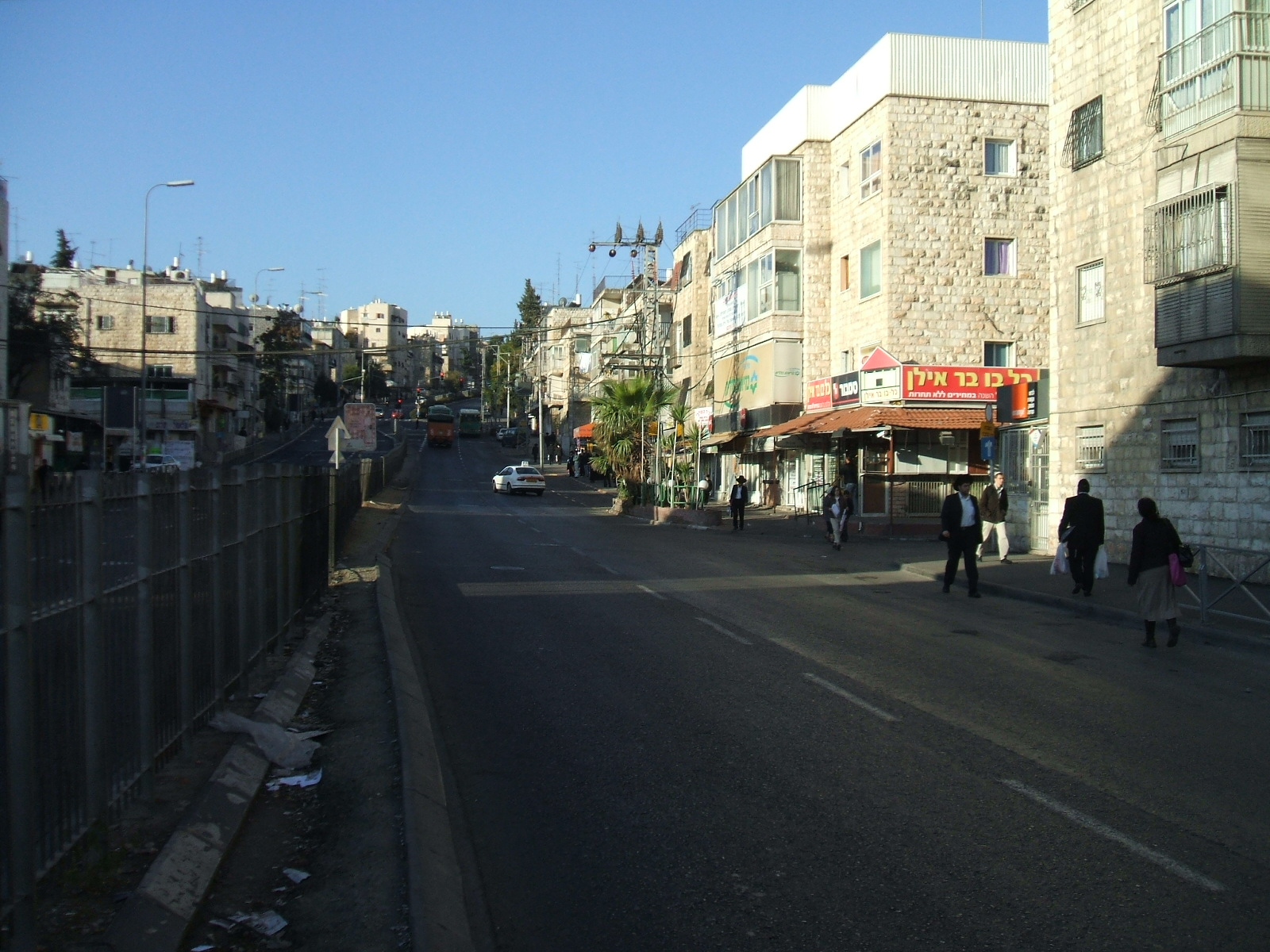
Early morning traffic-free view of Bar-Ilan Street

=== Bar-Ilan Street ===
Just past the Shikun Chabad neighborhood, the well-known Bar-Ilan St. named after Rabbi Meir Bar-Ilan, passes between the Haredi neighborhoods of Tel Arza, Mahanayim and Bukharim. Here the road serves as a major shopping street. In many sections, fencing exists on the median divider to prevent pedestrians from crossing between controlled intersections on this heavily congested section. Before 1955, this was called "The Ring Road", skirting around the northern edge of what was then the built-up area of central Jerusalem.

=== Hativat HarEl Street ===
Named after the famous Harel Brigade, this 0.3 km section widens into a 6-lane divided boulevard between the Sanhedria and Shmuel HaNavi neighborhoods.

=== Levi Eshkol Boulevard ===
This section, built in 1968, was named after Israel's third prime minister. The route continues past the Ma'alot Dafna, Ramat Eshkol and Givat HaMivtar neighborhoods. Just short of Haim Bar-Lev Boulevard (Highway 60), also known as Jerusalem Road 1, a 0.2 km tunnel provides an alternate route bypassing the congested traffic-light controlled intersection which includes a crossing of the Jerusalem Light Rail tracks.

=== Hebrew University Boulevard ===
This 0.6 km stretch passes Kiryat Menachem Begin, the Dan Jerusalem Hotel (formerly the Hyatt Regency) and the main entrance road to the Hebrew University's Har HaTsofim campus.

=== Wadi al-Joz Street ===
While most traffic continues straight through the new Har HaTzofim tunnels bypassing East Jerusalem's built-up areas and connecting to Highway 1 to Ma'ale Adumim and the Dead Sea, the official Route 417 makes a right turn southward onto Wadi al-Joz St. Here, in the Wadi al-Joz neighborhood, named after the "Walnut Valley", the street serves as a main commercial artery. This section of the road contains many auto-repair shops giving it the nickname among Hebrew speakers of 'Wadi Egzōz' (i.e., exhaust).

=== al-Maqdesi Street ===
Continuing southward as a commercial street, this 0.4 km stretch, named after the famous 10th-century Arab geographer, passes the Failey Center for the Arts and the Rockefeller Museum as it approaches the northeast corner of Jerusalem's Old City.

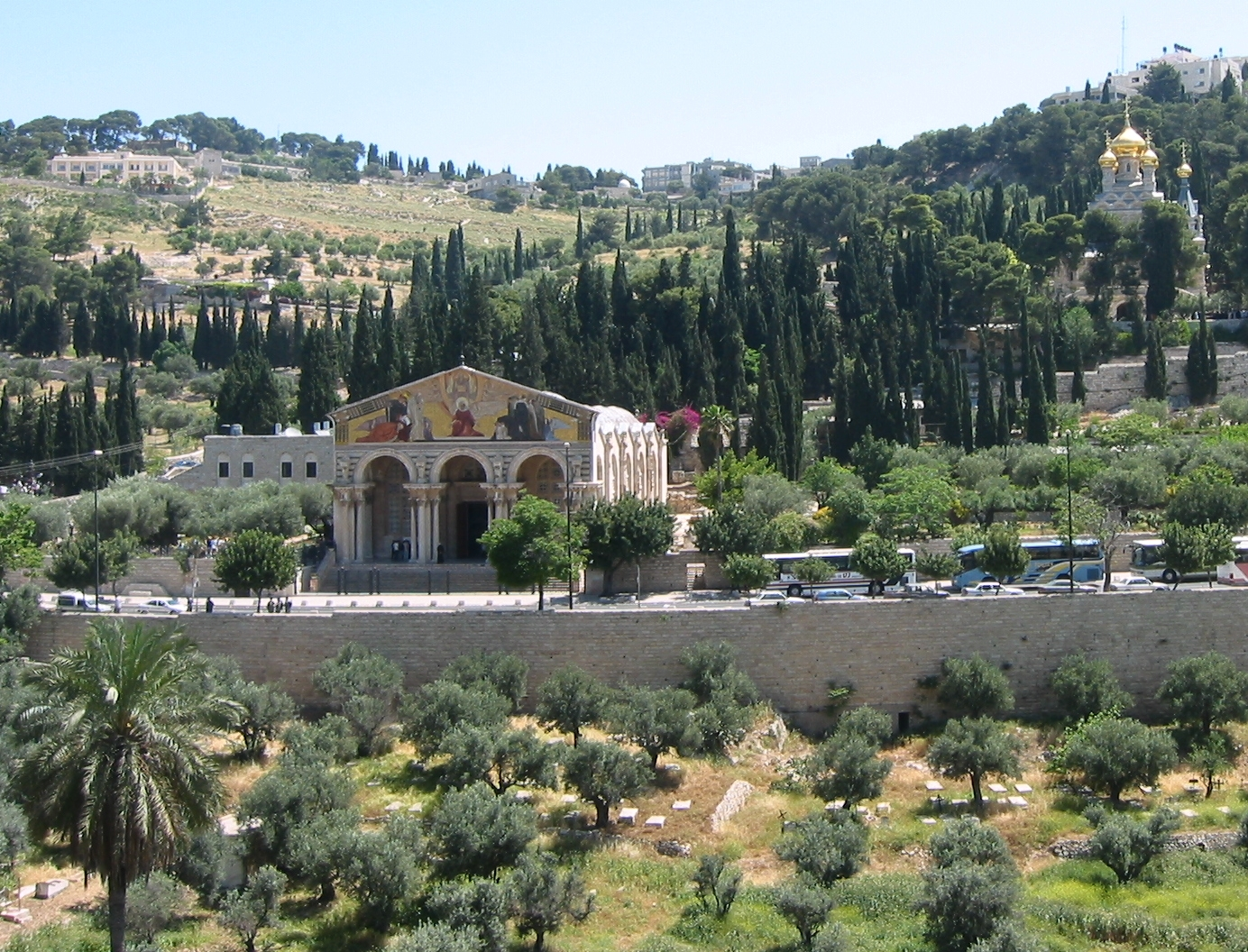
Jericho Road in the Kidron Valley, traditional site of Gethsemane with Church of All Nations (center) and Church of Maria Magdalene (upper right)

=== Jericho Road ===
Along the eastern edge of the Old City, the now named Jericho Road descends into the Kidron Valley, also known by its biblical name, the Valley of Josaphat. The valley is the site of many tombs: the Tomb of the Blessed Virgin Mary, the Pillar of Absalom, the Tomb of Benei Hezir, the Tomb of Zechariah, the tomb of Josaphat and the tomb of Saint James.

The road then runs along the bottom of the Mount of Olives and continues through the Ras al-Amud, Ma'ale ha-Zeitim and Wadi Qadum neighborhoods as a commercial street.

At ash-Shiyah Street at the edge of Abu Dis, the Israeli West Bank barrier has been erected. Originally including a security checkpoint, the road was permanently closed in 2006. Past the barrier, the road continues as a commercial artery through Abu Dis, al-Eizariya and Jahalin.

As it passes Ma'ale Adumim, the route becomes a freeway, finally merging into Highway 1 to the Jordan Valley.

== Junctions (west to east) ==
km	Location	Name	Type	Meaning	Road(s) Crossed
↓Jerusalem Municipality↓
Yirmiyahu Street
0	Romema				Weizmann Blvd. Strings Bridge
0.05	Romema				Jaffa Road
0.1	Romema				Ha Mem Gimel St.
0.2	Romema				Aholiab St., HaTvi St.
0.3	Romema				HaRikma St.
0.4	Romema				HaRikma St.
0.5	Romema				Tuval St. HaTchelet St.
0.6	Romema				HaTchelet St.
0.7	Romema				Argaman St.
1	Romema				Tuval St.
1.1	Romema				Shamgar St.
1.2	Romema	ככר לוין (Rabbi Levin Square)		named after Rabbi Pinhas Ya'akov; HaCohen Levin	Minhat Yitzhak St.
1.6	Shikun Chabad	ככר הרב עזריאל זעליג סלונים (Rabbi Azriel; Zelig Slonim Square)		named after Rabbi Avriel Zelig Slonim	Elkana St.
1.7	Tel Arza, Bukharim	ככר הרב אברמסקי (Rabbi Abramsky Square)		named after Rabbi Yehezkel Abramsky	Eli HaCohen St. Tsfanya St.
Bar-Ilan Street
1.73	Tel Arza, Bukharim	eastbound only			Issa Bracha St.
1.76	Tel Arza, Bukharim				Yosef Ziv St., HaBucharim St.
1.82	Tel Arza, Bukharim				Adoniyahu HaCohen St.
1.87	Mahanayim, Bukharim				Hacham Shmuel Bruchim St., Ki Tov St.
1.89	Mahanayim, Bukharim				Rabeinu Gershom St.
1.93	Mahanayim, Bukharim	westbound only			HaGaon MiTurda St.
1.96	Mahanayim, Bukharim				Ohalei Yosef St., Evyatar HaCohen St.
2.08	Mahanayim, Bukharim	eastbound only			Avinadav St.
2.2	Mahanayim, Bukharim, Sanhedriya, Shmuel HaNavi	ככר בית החיים (Beit HaHayyim Square)		House of Life (name of adjacent municipal Funeral Home)	Route 436 (Shmuel HaNavi St.)
Hativat HarEl Street
2.4	Sanhedriya, Shmuel HaNavi				Etz Hadar St.
2.6	Sanhedriya, Shmuel HaNavi				Eretz Hefetz St.
Levi Eshkol Boulevard
2.65	Ramat Eshkol, Ma'alot Dafna	westbound only			Mikvei Yisrael St.
2.7	Ramat Eshkol, Ma'alot Dafna				Mismar HaGvul St.
2.8	Green Line				
2.9	Ramat Eshkol, Ma'alot Dafna				Ma'avar HaMitla St., Ya'akov (Carl) Netter St.
3.5	Ramat Eshkol, Givat HaMivtar				Sheshet HaYammim St.
3.6	Givat HaMivtar, Givat HaTahmoshet, Kiryat Menachem Begin, HaGiv'a HaTzarfatit	ככר מיינרצהאגן (Meinertzhagen Square)		named after Richard Meinertzhagen	Highway 60 (Haim Bar-Lev Blvd.); Jerusalem Light Rail Station
Hebrew University Blvd.
4.1	Kiryat Menachem Begin, Har HaTsofim				Aharon Katzir St.
4.2	Wadi al-Joz, Har HaTsofim				Shayeret HaTzofim Blvd., Yitzhak HaNadiv St. (to Har HaTsofim Tunnels)
Wadi Al-Joz Street
4.3	Wadi Al-Joz				Beni Ummayya St.
4.5	Wadi Al-Joz				Abu Bakir as-Sideeq St.
4.8	Wadi Al-Joz				Ibn Tulun St.
4.9	Wadi Al-Joz				Uthman ibn Affan St.
5	Wadi Al-Joz				Khalid ibn al-Walid St.
5.1	Wadi al-Joz				Al-Maqdesi Street St.
Al-Maqdesi Street
5.2	Wadi al-Joz				Abu Hanifa St.
5.3	Wadi al-Joz				Akhwan as-Saffa St.
5.5	Wadi al-Joz				Al-Akhtal St.
5.6	Old City; Wadi al-Joz; Al-Sawaneh				Sultan Suleiman St., Samaw'al ibn 'Adiya St. (At-Tur Road)
Jericho Road
6.4	Old City				Lions' Gate Road
6.5	Old City				Ophel Road
6.6	Har HaZeitim				al-Mansuriya St.
7.2	Ras al-Amud; Ma'ale ha-Zeitim; Har HaZeitim				Panorama St
7.3	Ras al-Amud; Ma'ale ha-Zeitim				Ma'ale ha-Zeitim St
7.5	Har HaZeitim				local street
7.7	Ras al-Amud; Wadi Qadum	pedestrians only			Ras al-Amud St al-Sahel al-Akhdar St
7.8	Wadi Qadum				al-Ansar St; Nazalat Abu-Suwaiy St
8.2	ash-Sheikh; Wadi Qadum				Wadi Abdallah St.
8.25	ash-Sheikh; Wadi Qadum				al-Wafaa' St
8.75	ash-Sheikh; Wadi Qadum				local street
9	ash-Sheikh; Wadi Qadum; Abu Dis	Ras al-Qubsa Square			ash-Sheikh St. Ras al-Qubsa St.
↑Jerusalem Municipality↑
↓NO eastbound through-traffic↓
9	Abu Dis Security Checkpoint (closed)				
↑NO westbound through-traffic↑
9.5	Abu Dis				12 local streets
10.3	Abu Dis, al-Eizariya				local street
10.9	al-Eizariya				19 local streets
12.2	Jahalin				5 local streets
12.5	Jahalin				local street
12.6	Jahalin				2 local streets
↑NO westbound through-traffic for yellow (Israeli) license plates↑
13.7	Kedar				Kedar Road
13.8	Ma'ale Adumim	צומת מעלה אדומים (Ma'ale Adumim Junction)			Derech Har HaBayit
16	Ma'ale Adumim	מחלף אדומים (Adumim Interchange)		Red (Ascent)	Highway 1

== See also ==
- List of highways in Israel
