= Kafr 'Aqab =

Palestinian Arab neighborhood in East Jerusalem

Kafr 'Aqab كفر عقب
- Municipality type C

Arabic transcription(s)
  - Arabic: كفر عقب
  - Latin: Kafr Aqab
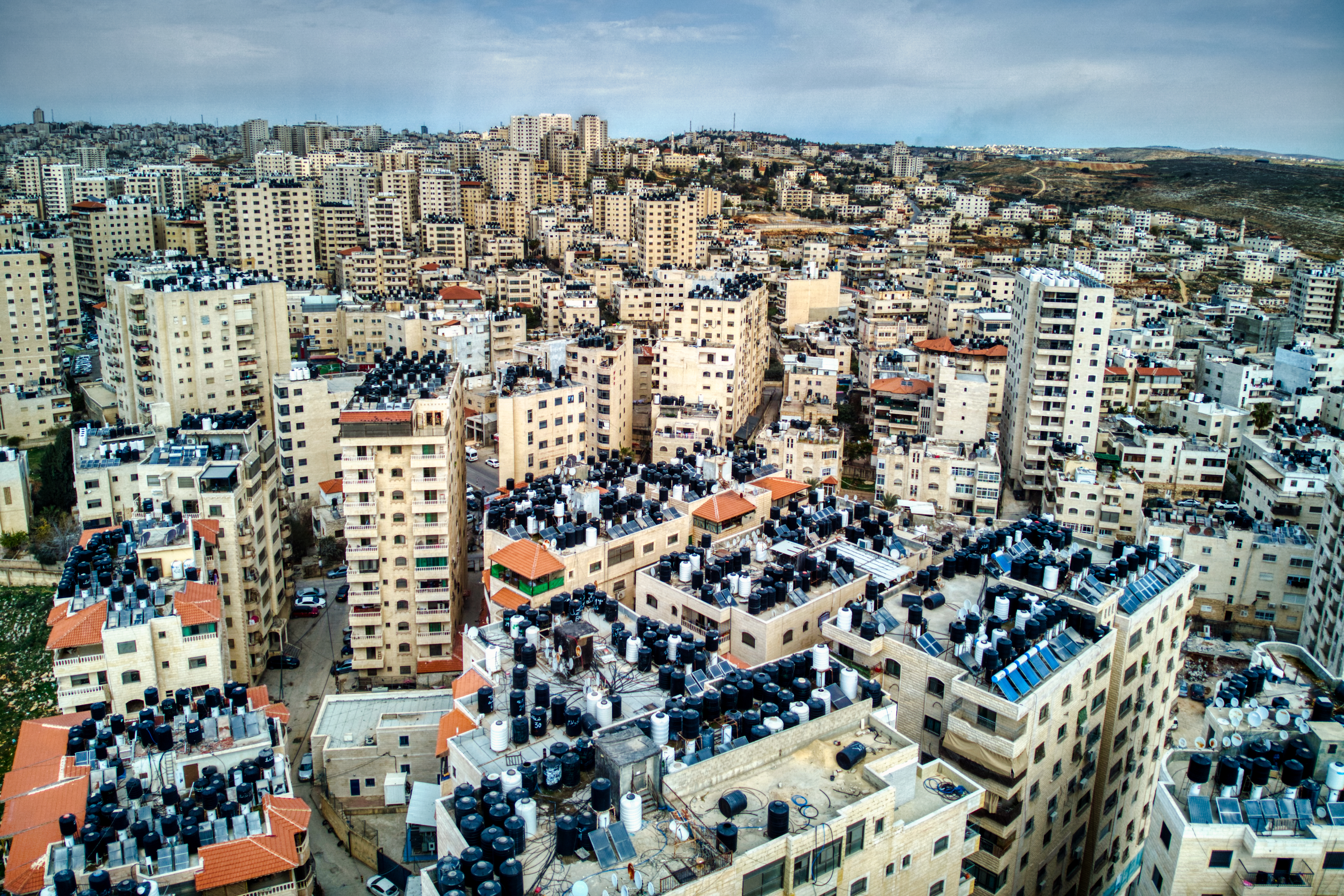
- Kfar 'Aqab, 2023

- Location of Kafr 'Aqab in East Jerusalem
- Coordinates: 31°52′33″N 35°13′11″E
- Palestine grid: 171/143
- Governorate: Quds

Government
  - Type: Municipality

Population (2017)
  - Total: 24,724
- Name meaning: The village of the steep or mountain road

Kafr 'Aqab (Arabic: كفر عقب) is the northernmost Palestinian Arab neighborhood in East Jerusalem. It is part of the area annexed and included in municipal Jerusalem following its occupation by Israel in 1967. This area includes an additional approximate 64 km^{2} (25 sq mi) (Note: According to Ian Lustick the area consisted of 71 km^{2} (27 sq mi)) of the West Bank, including territory which previously included 28 villages and areas of the Bethlehem and Beit Jala municipalities. Although the Jerusalem Law did not use the term, the Israeli Supreme Court interpreted the law as an effective annexation of East Jerusalem. The United Nations Security Council condemned the attempted change in status to Jerusalem and ruled the law "null and void" in United Nations Security Council Resolution 478.

Due to the Separation Wall effectively cutting the neighborhood off from the rest of Jerusalem, while no such barrier exists between this neighborhood and Ramallah and Al-Bireh, this neighborhood is practically part of the metropolitan area of Ramallah.

== Location ==
Kafr 'Aqab is located 11.2 kilometers (7.0 mi) north of Central Jerusalem and 2 kilometers (1.2 mi) southeast of Ramallah.

It is bordered by Burqa lands to the east, Al Bireh to the north, Rafat and Qalandiya to the west, and Ar Ram, Qalandiya and Qalandiya Camp to the south.

== History ==
The Palestine Exploration Fund's Survey of Western Palestine (SWP) suggested that Kafr 'Aqab was the Crusader village Kefreachab, which was one of 21 villages given by King Godfrey as a fief to the Church of the Holy Sepulchre.

=== Ottoman era ===
In 1517, the village was included in the Ottoman Empire with the rest of Palestine and in the 1596 tax-records it appeared as Kafr 'Aqba, located in the Nahiya of Jabal Quds of the Liwa of Al-Quds. The population was 47 households, all Muslims. They paid a fixed tax rate of 33,3% on agricultural products, including wheat, barley, olive trees, vineyards, fruit trees, goats and beehives in addition to "occasional revenues"; a total of 3,100 akçe.

In 1838, Edward Robinson noted Kafr 'Aqab during his travels in the region, as a Muslim village, part of El-Kuds district.

An official Ottoman village list sometime around 1870 listed Kefr 'Akab as having 15 houses and a population of 65, though the population count included men, only. In 1883, SWP described it as "a small hamlet on the slope of a hillside, with a few olives."

In 1896 the population of Kefr 'akab was estimated to be about 135 persons.

=== British Mandate era ===
In the 1922 census of Palestine conducted by the British Mandate authorities, Kafr 'Aqab had a population of 189 Muslims, increasing in the 1931 census to 250 Muslims, in 59 houses.

In the 1945 statistics the population of Kafr 'Aqab consisted of 290 Muslims and the land area was 5,472 dunams, according to an official land and population survey. Of this, 829 dunams were for plantations and irrigable land, 2,736 for cereals, while 10 dunams were built-up areas.

=== Jordanian era ===
In the wake of the 1948 Arab–Israeli War, and after the 1949 Armistice Agreements, Kafr 'Aqab came under Jordanian rule, and was annexed in 1950.

In 1961, the population was 410 persons.

=== Post-1967 ===
After the Six-Day War in 1967, Kafr 'Aqab has been under Israeli occupation. The population in the 1967 census conducted by the Israeli authorities was 287, of whom 8 originated from the Israeli territory.

Israel has confiscated 2,037 dunams of land from Kafr 'Aqab in order to construct the Israeli settlement of Kokhav Ya'acov.

According to the Palestinian Central Bureau of Statistics, in 2006, Kafr 'Aqab had a population of 10,411. Primary health care for Kafr 'Aqab is obtained in Al-Ram. In 2007, Kfar 'Aqab was described as a middle class suburb.

While Kafr 'Aqab was unilaterally annexed by Israel with the rest of East Jerusalem and falls under its full jurisdiction, it is separated from Jerusalem by the Israeli West Bank barrier. Municipal inspectors never inspect the area beyond the barrier. This creates "a planning nightmare and developer's dream".

The al-Faruq mosque in Kafr 'Aqab offers weekly classes in the Islamic teachings of Hizb ut-Tahrir.

=== 2020s ===
The Israeli Construction and Housing Ministry began preparing the master plan for a new Israeli neighborhood to be located at the northern edge of Jerusalem on land near the former Atarot airport currently inhabited by some 15 Palestinian families and will stretch up to the separation barrier, which will be the border between the new neighborhood and the Palestinian Kafr Aqab neighborhood. The land has been slated to become part of the Palestinian state under U.S. President Donald Trump's peace plan. Though Kafr Aqab is considered to be part of Jerusalem, it is on the other side of the barrier wall.

== Gallery ==
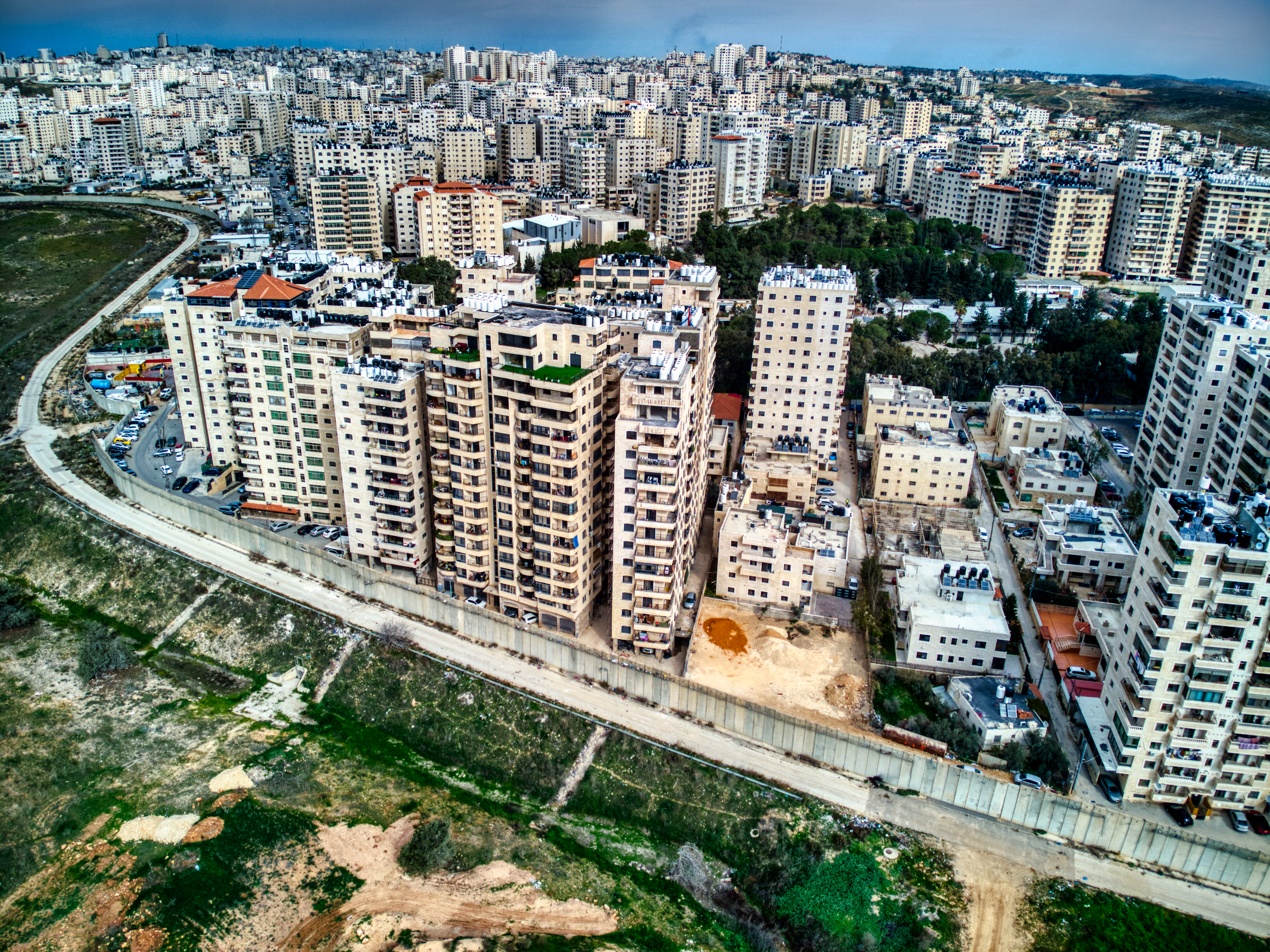
Kafr 'Aqab neighborhood near the Jerusalem International Airport and the Israeli West Bank barrier

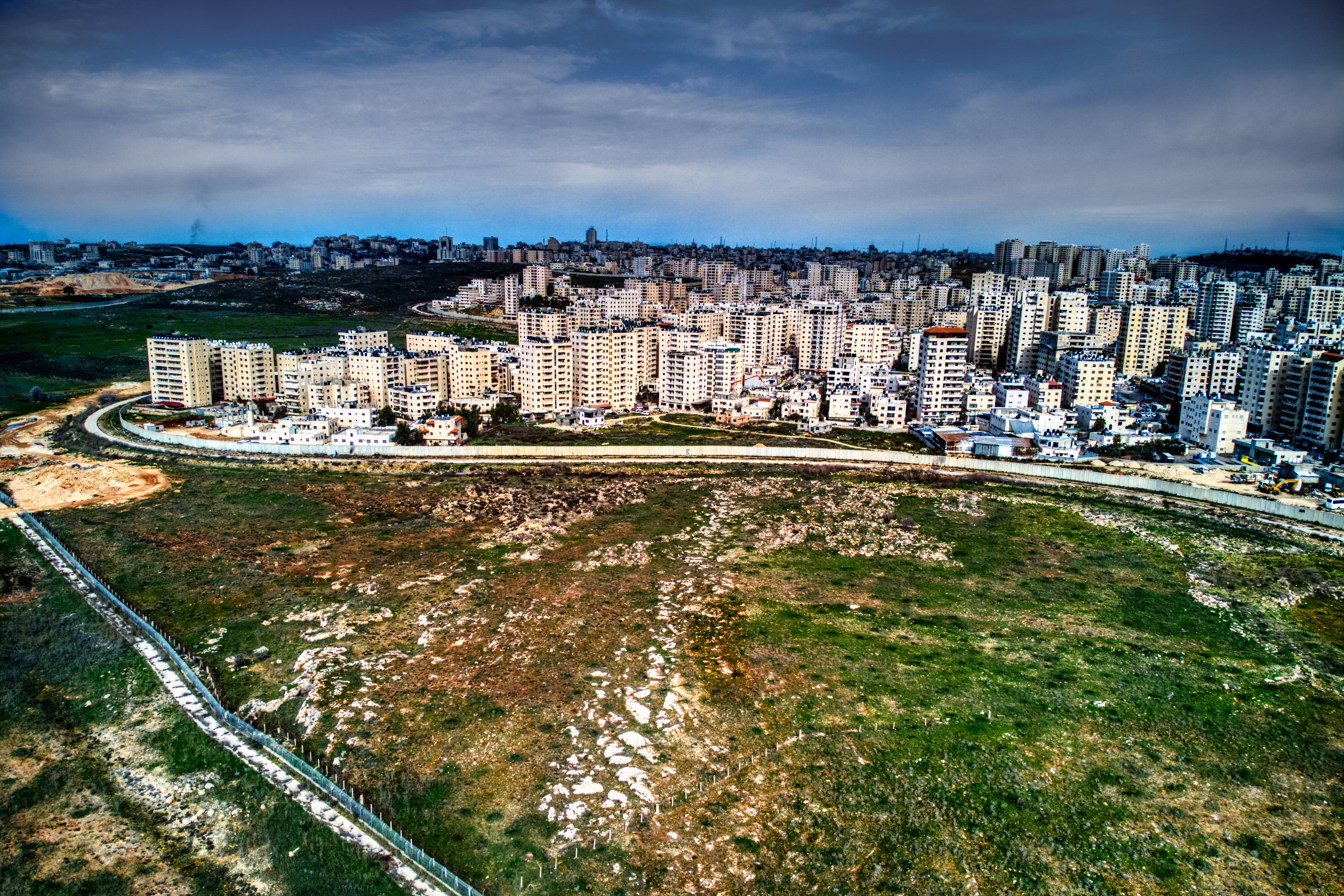
Kafr 'Aqab, the Israeli West Bank barrier, Semiramis neighborhood and Beyond - Ramalla

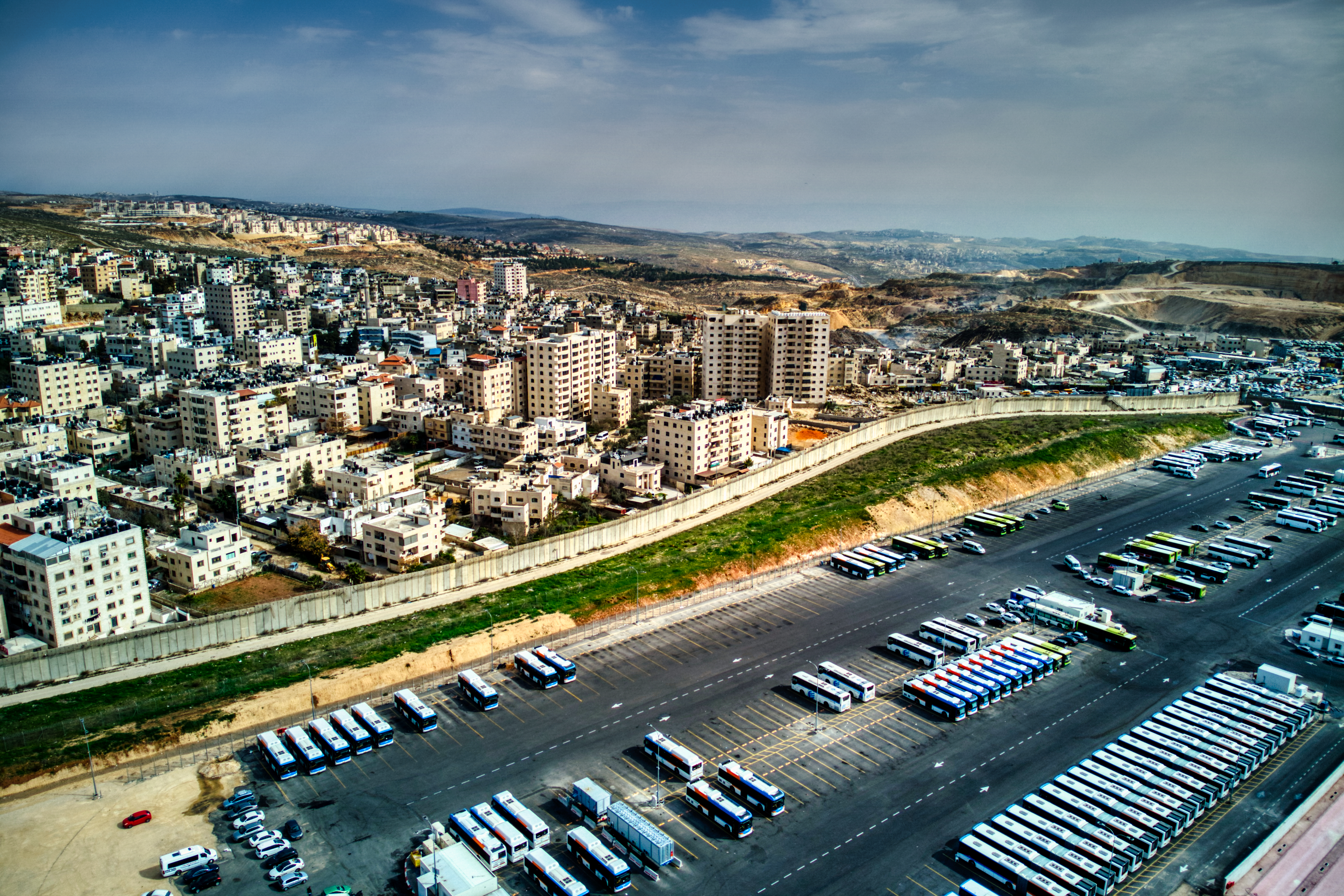
southern Kafr 'Aqab and Qalandia Refugee Camp

== Bibliography ==
- Abu Raya, Rafa‘ (1996). "Kafr 'Aqab". Hadashot Arkheologiyot – Excavations and Surveys in Israel (129).
- Barron, J.B., ed. (1923). Palestine: Report and General Abstracts of the Census of 1922. Government of Palestine.
- Conder, C.R.; Kitchener, H.H. (1883). The Survey of Western Palestine: Memoirs of the Topography, Orography, Hydrography, and Archaeology. Vol. 3. London: Committee of the Palestine Exploration Fund.
- Government of Jordan, Department of Statistics (1964). First Census of Population and Housing. Volume I: Final Tables; General Characteristics of the Population (PDF).
- Government of Palestine, Department of Statistics (1945). Village Statistics, April, 1945.
- Hadawi, S. (1970). Village Statistics of 1945: A Classification of Land and Area ownership in Palestine. Palestine Liberation Organization Research Center.
- Hartmann, M. (1883). "Die Ortschaftenliste des Liwa Jerusalem in dem türkischen Staatskalender für Syrien auf das Jahr 1288 der Flucht (1871)". Zeitschrift des Deutschen Palästina-Vereins. 6: 102–149.
- Hütteroth, W.-D.; Abdulfattah, K. (1977). Historical Geography of Palestine, Transjordan and Southern Syria in the Late 16th Century. Erlanger Geographische Arbeiten, Sonderband 5. Erlangen, Germany: Vorstand der Fränkischen Geographischen Gesellschaft. ISBN 3-920405-41-2.
- Lustick, Ian (1997). "Has Israel Annexed East Jerusalem?". Middle East Policy. 5 (1): 34–45. doi:10.1111/j.1475-4967.1997.tb00247.x. Archived from the original (PDF) on 20 November 2009.
- Mills, E., ed. (1932). Census of Palestine 1931. Population of Villages, Towns and Administrative Areas. Jerusalem: Government of Palestine.
- Morris, B. (2004). The Birth of the Palestinian Refugee Problem Revisited. Cambridge University Press. ISBN 978-0-521-00967-6. (p. 80)
- Palmer, E.H. (1881). The Survey of Western Palestine: Arabic and English Name Lists Collected During the Survey by Lieutenants Conder and Kitchener, R. E. Transliterated and Explained by E.H. Palmer. Committee of the Palestine Exploration Fund.
- Robinson, E.; Smith, E. (1841). Biblical Researches in Palestine, Mount Sinai and Arabia Petraea: A Journal of Travels in the year 1838. Vol. 2. Boston: Crocker & Brewster.
- Robinson, E.; Smith, E. (1841). Biblical Researches in Palestine, Mount Sinai and Arabia Petraea: A Journal of Travels in the year 1838. Vol. 3. Boston: Crocker & Brewster.
- Röhricht, R. (1893). (RRH) Regesta regni Hierosolymitani (MXCVII-MCCXCI) (in Latin). Berlin: Libraria Academica Wageriana. (Röhricht, 1893, RRH, pp. 16-17, No 74)
- de Roziére, E., ed. (1849). Cartulaire de l'église du Saint Sépulchre de Jérusalem: publié d'après les manuscrits du Vatican (in Latin and French). Paris: Imprimerie nationale.
- Schick, C. (1896). "Zur Einwohnerzahl des Bezirks Jerusalem". Zeitschrift des Deutschen Palästina-Vereins. 19: 120–127.
- Socin, A. (1879). "Alphabetisches Verzeichniss von Ortschaften des Paschalik Jerusalem". Zeitschrift des Deutschen Palästina-Vereins. 2: 135–163.
