= 'Arab al-Jahalin =

ʿArab al-Jahalin
- Municipality type D (Village council)

Arabic transcription(s)
  - Arabic: عرب الجهالّين
  - Latin: 'Arab al-Jahaleen (official) al-Jabal (unofficial)
- Location of ʿArab al-Jahalin within Palestine
- Coordinates: 31°45′50.64″N 35°16′51.44″E
- State: State of Palestine
- Governorate: Quds
- Founded: 1998

Government
  - Type: Village council

Population (2017)
  - Total: 1,856
- Name meaning: "the Jahalin Arabs"

ʿArab al-Jahalin also known as al-Jabal (Arabic: عرب الجهالّين) is a Palestinian Bedouin neighborhood in the Jerusalem Governorate, located five kilometers southeast of Jerusalem in the West Bank. According to the Palestinian Central Bureau of Statistics (PCBS), ʿArab al-Jahalin had a population of approximately 1,856 inhabitants in mid-year 2017. The village is situated on a hillside outside al-Eizariya and 300 meters away from the Jerusalem Municipal dump. It is located in Area C of the West Bank, with few parts is in Area B. While the Israeli government has full control over the village, the populace hold Palestinian IDs.

ʿArab al-Jahalin contains a mosque, a seven-class school and a 12-class school. The village is linked to the East Jerusalem electricity system and has running water. As-Sawahira ash-Sharqiya shares the facilities, particularly schools and health amenities with the villages of ʿArab al-Jahalin, Jabal Mukaber and ash-Sheikh Sa'd. The healthcare facilities for as-Sawahira ash Sharqiya are designated as Ministry of Health level 2. All residents of the ʿArab al-Jahalin are refugees and have UNRWA refugee papers.

== History ==
The ʿArab al-Jahalin tribe were originally based around Tel Arad in the northern Negev, but were entirely evicted from the area in the early 1950s by the Israel Defense Forces (IDF). Prior to Israel's victory in the 1967 Six-Day War, they negotiated with Palestinian landowners to set up semi-permanent camps in, and pasture their flocks around, an area between Ramallah, Wadi Qelt and Jerusalem, maintaining the traditional Bedouin lifestyle.

=== Jordanian period ===
In the wake of the 1948 Arab–Israeli War, and after the 1949 Armistice Agreements, the area came under Jordanian rule.

=== Post-1967 ===
Since the 1967 war, 'Arab al-Jahalin has been under Israeli occupation.

In 1975 the IDF confiscated 4,217 dunams of land from 'Arab al-Jahalin, land which in 1977 was used for construction the Israeli settlement of Ma'ale Adumim.

After the 1995 accords, 3.3% (or 74 dunams) of the land was classified as Area B, the remaining 96.7% (or 2,197 dunams) as Area C.

In July 1994, the Israeli Civil Administration executed an eviction order relocating as number of residents to a site adjacent to a Jerusalem municipal garbage dump at Abu Dis, Throughout the 1990s there were 100-120 military or court orders for the eviction of al-Jahalin Bedouin. In 1997 and 1998, two further forcible expulsions of the Jahalin were implemented, with a further 1,050 relocated to Abu Dis. In the same year, an appeal resulted in a deal between the Israeli Civil Administration and representatives of 35 al-Jahalin families (about 200 individuals) who were permitted to "lease" what Israel considers to be state lands but which, according to the Jahalin themselves, belong to the local Palestinians of Abu Dis. With the founding of the village of ʿArab al-Jahalin, the relocated Bedouin complained that the allocated area deprived them of pasturage that might enable them to continue their traditional herding lifestyle, forcing 70% of the al-Jahalin to sell off their livestock. The area is also affected by a strong stench, caused by high quantities of methane gas, a process that will continue for at least two decades even after the proposed closure of the dump.

In 2012, plans to relocate the tribe adjacent to the Abu Dis garbage dump were dropped, with the military-run Civil Administration stating it would select a different site. On 16 September 2014 it was announced that they would be moved to a new area in the Jordan Valley north of Jericho. A documentary film about the current status of the Jahalin was released in April 2012.

== See also ==
- Negev Bedouin
- "Bedouin Representative Explains Area C Displacement to President of the European Parliament &#124". UNRWA.
