= Khan al-Ahmar (village) =

Palestinian village in the Jerusalem Governorate of the West Bank

Khan al-Ahmar الخان الأحمر
- Village
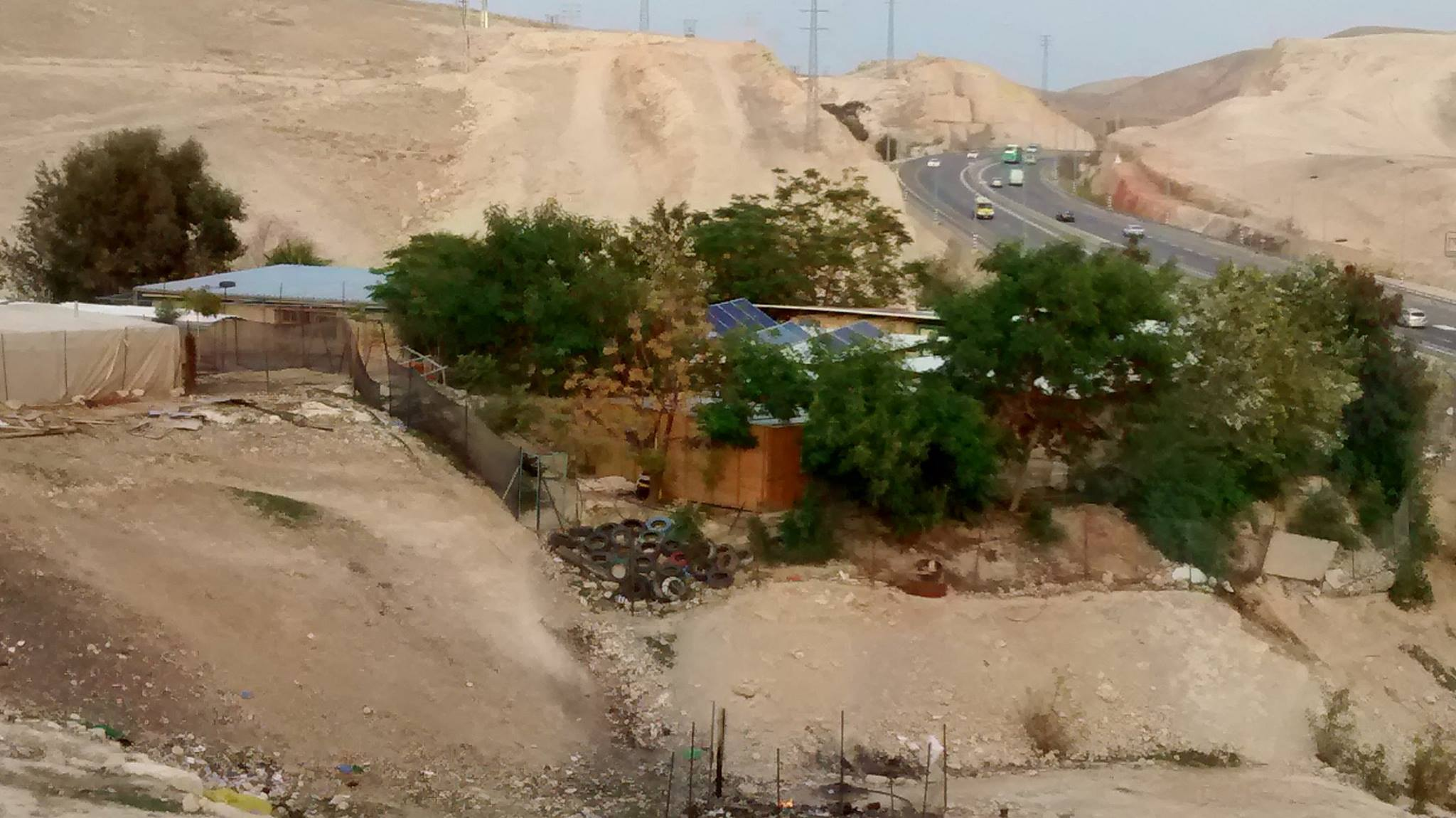
- View of internationally-funded school building
- Nickname: Red Caravanserai
- Interactive map of Khan al-Ahmar
- Coordinates: 31°48′45.00″N 35°20′16.00″E
- State: State of Palestine
- Governorate: Quds
- Elevation: 225 m (738 ft)

Population (2018)
  - Total: ~173–180
- including 92 children
- Time zone: UTC+02:00 (IST, PST)
  - Summer (DST): UTC+03:00 (IDT, PDT)

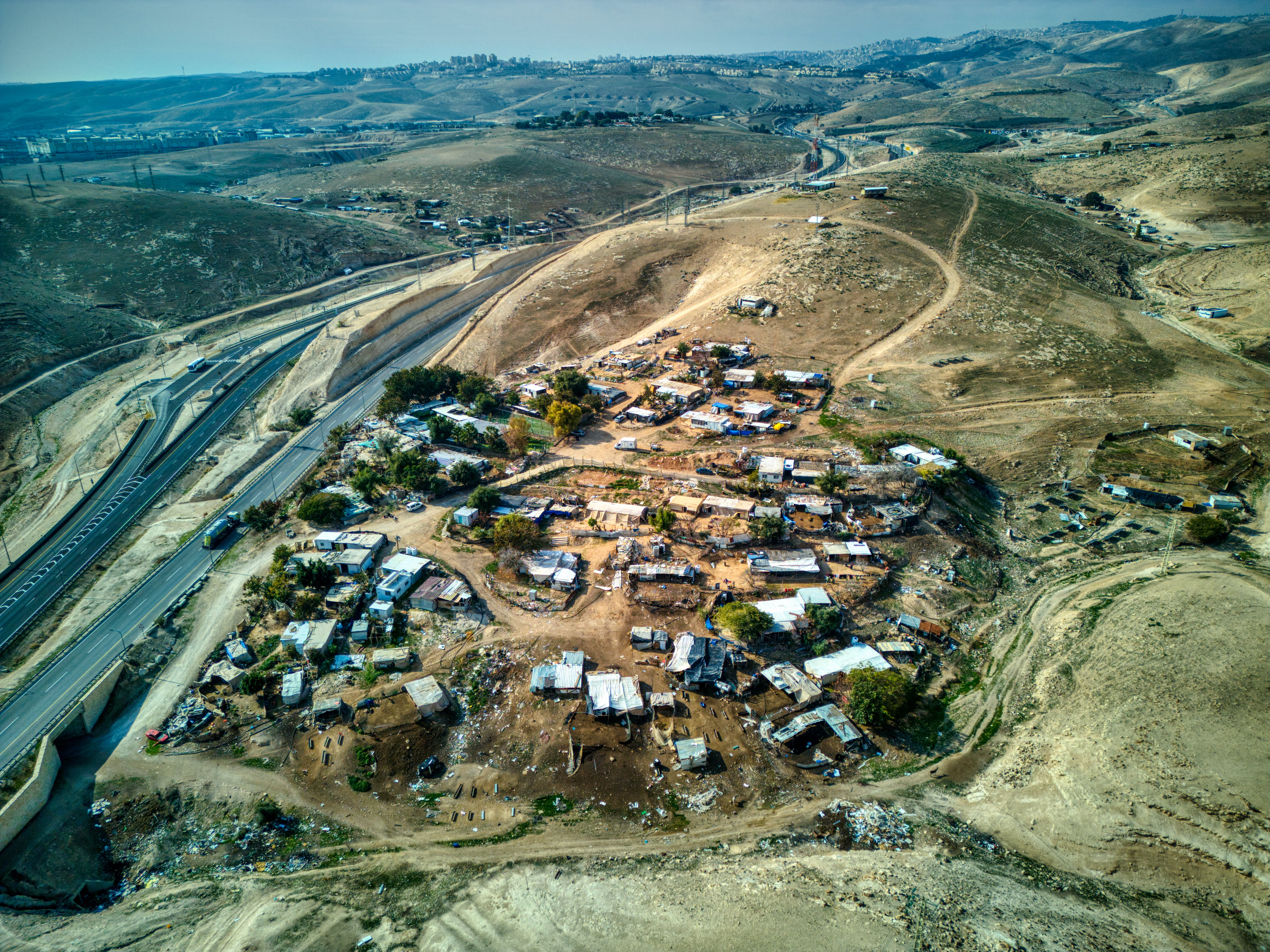
Khan al-Ahmar, 2025

Khan al-Ahmar (Arabic: الخان الأحمر, Hebrew: חאן אל-אחמאר, lit. The Red Caravansary) is a Palestinian village (sometimes referred to as the "Khan al-Ahmar school community") located in the Khan al-Ahmar area of the Jerusalem Governorate of the West Bank. In 2018, there were between 173 and 180 Bedouin, including 92 children, living there in tents and huts, upwards of 100 in 2010, with its local school serving the needs of 150 children in the area. Khan al-Ahmar is located between the Israeli settlements of Ma'ale Adumim and Kfar Adumim on the north side of Highway 1, between the junctions with Route 437 and Route 458.

In May 2018, the Israeli High Court of Justice determined that its residents could be evicted. The United Nations, the International Criminal Court, the European Parliament and Amnesty International have stated that the demolition of the village would be a violation of international law, being a breach of the Fourth Geneva Convention, and may amount to a war crime. On 20 October 2018, the Israeli government announced that it would postpone the demolition. Subsequently, it was announced in 2019 that there would be no decision on demolition pending the election of a new government.

On 18 July 2021, the new government Foreign Minister Yair Lapid wrote that "Given that the new government was formed recently, and therefore has not yet been able to examine the issue in depth independently and not relying on the conclusions of the previous government, and considering that this is a particularly sensitive issue," he wanted to conduct an in-depth review and the court was asked for a delay until 14 September 2021. After 8 extensions up to 1 February 2023, the government asked once more for a further 4 month delay until 1 June 2023. The court granted an extension to 1 May for the hearing and to 1 April for the state to file its position.

On 7 May 2023, Israel's Supreme Court denied the Regavim petition, accepting the government's argument that the eviction should be stayed "for current reasons related to the security of a country and its foreign relations" and that the government would itself decide when that would happen.

== History ==
=== Location along a historical road ===
The relatively larger Bedouin village and the other, connected encampments, are all placed along the main road connecting Jerusalem and Jericho. The modern highway follows, with some minor deviations, the very important historical road sometimes known by a biblical name as the "ascent of Adummim" (Joshua 15:7, 18:17), which for a while follows the top of a ridge that forms the southern bank of Wadi Qelt and separates it from Wadi Tal‘at ed-Damm, Arabic for the "Valley of the Ascent of Blood". The Ascent of Adummim was known to the Crusaders as the "Ascent of Blood".

=== British Mandate ===
According to the 1931 census of Palestine conducted by the British Mandate authorities, Khan el Ahmar (Jericho sub district) had a population of 27; 25 Muslims and 2 Christians, in a total of 3 houses.

In the 1945 statistics Khan el Ahmar had 16,380 dunams of land, but zero population, according to an official land and population survey. Of this, 538 dunams were used for cereals, while 15,842 dunams were classified non-cultivable land.

=== After 1948 ===
Many of the families currently living in Khan al-Ahmar, came from the Bedouin Jahalin tribe, when they were expelled from the Negev in 1952 by the Israeli army. They moved the following year to the West Bank, under Jordanian administration, and settled in the area of the old Khan al-Ahmar.

=== After 1967 ===
In the late 1970s, Khan al-Ahmar found itself incorporated into lands that were assigned to a new Israeli settlement, which became the present-day Maale Adumim. The village is one of the only remaining Palestinian areas within the E1 zone, strategically significant because it connects the north and south of the West Bank.

=== 2009 ===
In July 2009, the Italian aid organization Vento Di Terra, (Wind of Earth) and other volunteers built a school in the village, using the radical tyre-mud earth method, to address the needs of the community and the difficulty for children to access other schools within the West Bank. This was the first school the Jahalin community ever had, one under the supervision of the Palestinian Ministry of Education. Emblazoned on its front is a sign reading: "We will remain here as long as the za’atar and the olives remain."

A demolition order was served against the school by the Civil Administration one month after it opened, on the basis that it had been built too close to Highway 1, for which expansion plans have already been approved (although representatives of the State have stated demolition would not be carried out until the village relocation is completed).

== Bedouin communities in Area C ==
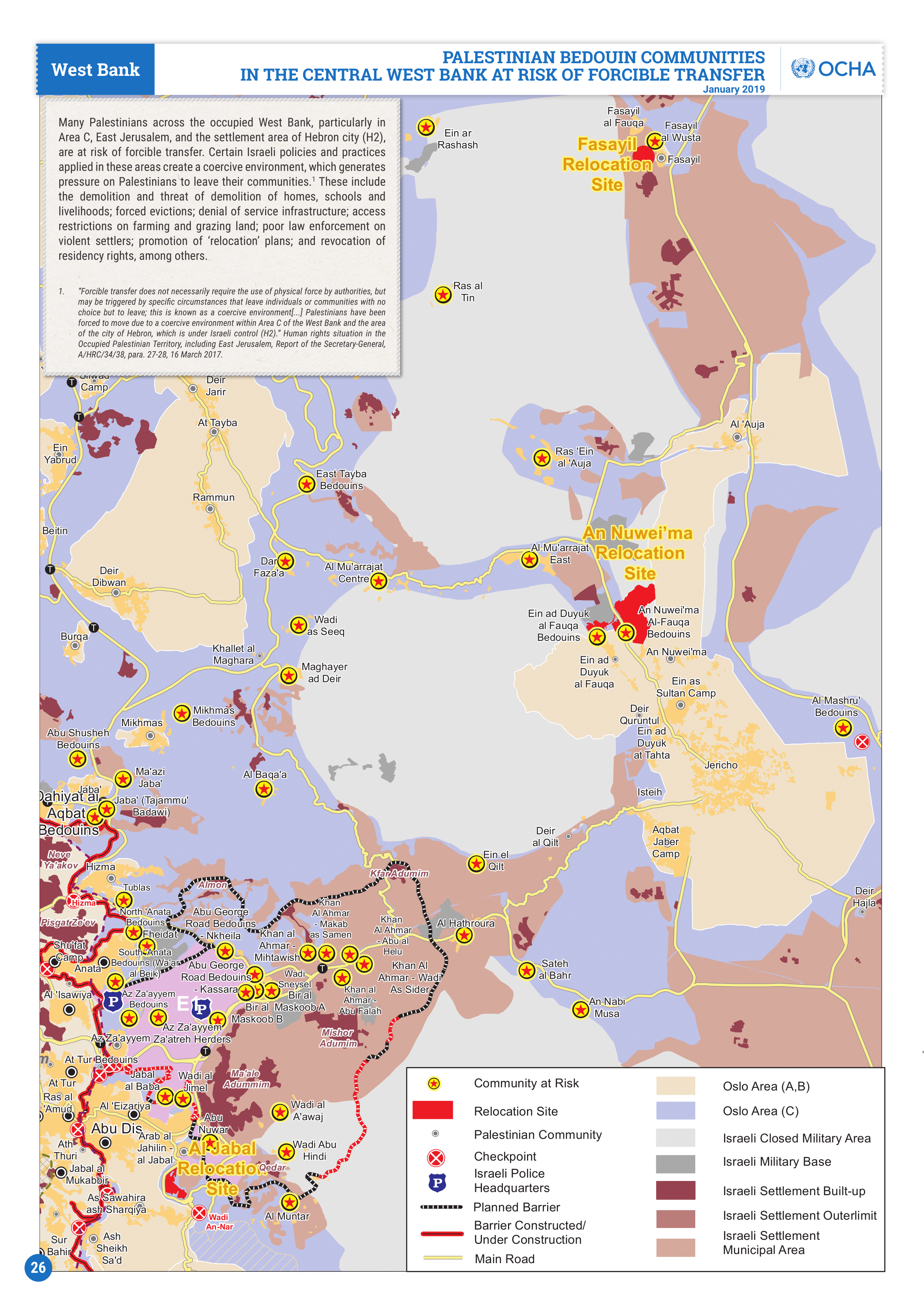
Bedouin communities at risk of forced transfer. OCHA, January 2019

=== Coercive environment ===
The UNHCR annual report (November 2016 through October 2017) on Israel settlements describes a "coercive environment" in Area C:

Forcible transfer does not necessarily require the use of physical force by authorities; it may be triggered by specific factors that give individuals or communities no choice but to leave, amounting to what is known as a "coercive environment".

=== Communities at risk ===
In order to establish and expand Ma’ale Adumim (the situation is similar in the South Hebron Hills and Jordan Valley), hundreds of Bedouins of the al-Jahalin tribe were expelled from where they lived and relocated to a site near the Abu Dis landfill. About 3,000 people in the area still face the threat of expulsion and about 1,400 of these live in the E1 area. According to the UN, Khan al-Ahmar is one of 46 Bedouin communities that the UN considers to be at high risk of forcible transfer in the central West Bank.

=== Legal conflict ===
The village was slated to be demolished by Israel in February 2010 due to allegations of illegal building. The Israeli state announced plans in September 2012 to relocate the villagers to the an-Nuway'imah area in the Jordan Valley, north of Jericho. The people of Khan al-Ahmar have opposed this plan. Abu Khamiss, a spokesperson for Khan al-Ahmar residents, said in 2015 that the relocation site would be "like a prison for us".

Since 2009, residents of the nearby Israeli settlements of Kfar Adumim, Alon and Nofei Prat, assisted by the settler NGO Regavim, have filed petitions to the Israeli Supreme Court calling for the Israeli military to immediately carry out the standing demolition order against 257 Palestinian structures in the area, including the Khan al-Ahmar school. A lawyer representing the Bedouin community has also petitioned to overturn the demolition order against the school. UNRWA, which operates an education program in Palestine, has also campaigned to defend the Khan al-Ahmar school, arguing that demolishing the school would "effectively deny the children of the community their education and jeopardise their future". The court has so far rejected both sets of petitioners, leaving the village with standing demolition orders.

In 2015, Palestinian NGO Future for Palestine donated solar panels to provide the village with electricity. In July, the Civil Administration confiscated the solar panels, as well as one which had been in the village for several years.

In September 2017 Israeli military authorities in the West Bank notified the Khan al-Ahmar villagers that their only option would be to move to "Jahalin West", a site near the Abu Dis garbage dump which had been specially allocated for them to that end. A lawyer who filed a petition against the relocation on behalf of the Jahalin tribe says that the land is claimed by Abu Dis residents, and that the area Israel would allocate to each prospective large Bedouin family and their herds there is no more than approximately 250 sq. metres. The Israeli indologist and peace activist David Dean Shulman has described the proposed site as "next to the municipal dump that is now a high hill known simply as “Jabel,” The Hill. No one can live on or near the Jabel. The stench is overpowering, and disease rampant. To dump these human beings on the dump is one of those acts that tell all."

=== 2018 Supreme Court decision ===
On 24 May 2018, the Israeli Supreme Court ruled that, starting from June, the Israeli army can move the village to a different location. Justice Noam Sohlberg, himself a resident of an Israeli settlement in the West Bank, wrote that the grounds for the decision, which rejected a villagers' petition for a stay in the order, was that the residents had unlawfully engaged in building both the school and housing, and that it was not within the court's remit to meddle in the execution of Israeli state laws. David Zonsheine, executive director of the Israeli Human Rights NGO, B'tselem, stated that Israel had failed to connect the township to water, power and sewerage services, and that the villagers had built without permits because Israeli policy is such that it dissuades Palestinian villagers from even trying to obtain licenses to build. Human Rights Watch also reports that the Israeli military does not issue the required permits for building to Palestinians in Area C of the West Bank. The effect of the dismantlement and evictions will be, he added, to bisect the West Bank, separating the north from the south.

On 1 August 2018, the court heard a new petition and asked the parties to try and settle; the state was asked to detail its proposal for an alternate site. Responding on 7 August, the state insisted on expulsion as originally proposed but said it would be prepared to advance plans for a new site for the community in a desert location south-west of Jericho if residents of three neighboring communities would also relocate and all residents to leave "consensually". The community rejected this proposal on 16 August 2018 noting that the demand to link the expulsion of three additional communities exposed the ultimate goal to remove all Palestinian communities in order to split the West Bank in two and in keeping with the route planned for the Separation Barrier. On 5 September 2018, dismissed the residents' petitions stipulating the ruling of 24 May 2018 as conclusive.

=== Responses and delay ===
Minister of State for the Middle East at the UK Foreign and Commonwealth Office Alistair Burt said that the proposed relocation of any people might be taken by the United Nations as an act constituting the forcible transfer of people. Some 300 public intellectuals, legal scholars, parliamentarians and artists the world over published an open letter stating that: "Forcible transfer – by direct physical force or by creating a coercive environment that makes residents leave their homes – is a war crime."

On July 4, Palestinian demonstrators protested the demolition of their village. Al Jazeera reported that 35 Palestinians were wounded by Israeli security forces during the protest. The New York Times reported that "For decades, Israel has wanted to clear a large section of the West Bank of several thousand Bedouins."

On 13 September 2018, the European Parliament passed a resolution on "The threat of demolition of Khan al-Ahmar and other Bedouin villages" warning "...that the demolition of Khan al-Ahmar and the forcible transfer of its residents would constitute a grave breach of international humanitarian law;"

On 30 September, a day before the demolition deadline, thousands of protesters gathered near the village.

On 1 October 2018, Amnesty International stated that the demolition of Khan al-Ahmar would constitute a "cruel blow and war crime". It pointed it out that "the Court ruled that the village was built without relevant building permits, even though these are impossible for Palestinians to obtain in the Israeli-controlled areas of the West Bank known as Area C".

In early October 2018, Jewish community and religious leaders in the United States submitted a letter to Prime Minister Benjamin Netanyahu to stop the demolition of the village. They've stated that in their opinion the demolition would "add another obstacle to the already frayed efforts to resolve the Palestinian – Israeli conflict, further hindering the path to peace and justice".

The preparation for the demolition started around 15 October. On that day, two Israelis and two Palestinians were detained after climbing on top of bulldozer. Activists reported that security forces had been "violently pushing back dozens of protesters" who had converged on the scene upon the arrival of Israeli troops, and that at least three had been injured. Many other bulldozers were also on site to pave additional roads in preparation for the demolition, alongside around 50 Israeli police and border police officers.

Locals and activists have accused settlers in the nearby Kfar Adumim of purposely allowing sewage to leak down to the village. Such flood has occurred twice in October. The mayor denied this accusation.

On 17 October 2018, International Criminal Court prosecutor Fatou Bensouda, in a statement regarding her preliminary examination of the "situation in Palestine", said;

I have been following with concern the planned eviction of the Bedouin community of Khan al-Ahmar, in the West Bank. Evacuation by force now appears imminent, and with it the prospects for further escalation and violence.It bears recalling, as a general matter, that extensive destruction of property without military necessity and population transfers in an occupied territory constitute war crimes under the Rome Statute.

On 19 October, the Ma'an News Agency reported that a large numbers of Israeli forces surrounded Khan al-Ahmar and sealed off its main entrance, declaring it a closed military zone. A day later, the Israeli government has announced that it would postpone the demolition of the village. Right wing activists and politicians, including Moti Yogev, condemned the delay and called on Prime Minister Benjamin Netanyahu to rescind it.

In response to a new petition filed by Regavim (NGO) demanding that the government execute the judgement, the government requested a delay until the new 2019 elections are concluded and a new government in place.

On 18 July 2021, the new government Foreign Minister Yair Lapid wrote that "Given that the new government was formed recently, and therefore has not yet been able to examine the issue in depth independently and not relying on the conclusions of the previous government, and considering that this is a particularly sensitive issue," he wanted to conduct an in-depth review and the court was asked for a delay until 14 September 2021. After 8 extensions up to 1 February 2023, the government asked once more for a further 4 month delay until 1 June 2023. The court granted an extension to 1 May for the hearing and to 1 April for the state to file its position.

On 7 May 2023, Israel's Supreme Court denied the Regavim petition, accepting the government argument that the eviction should be stayed "for current reasons related to the security of a country and its foreign relations" and that the government would itself decide when that would happen.

== Name and related archaeological sites ==
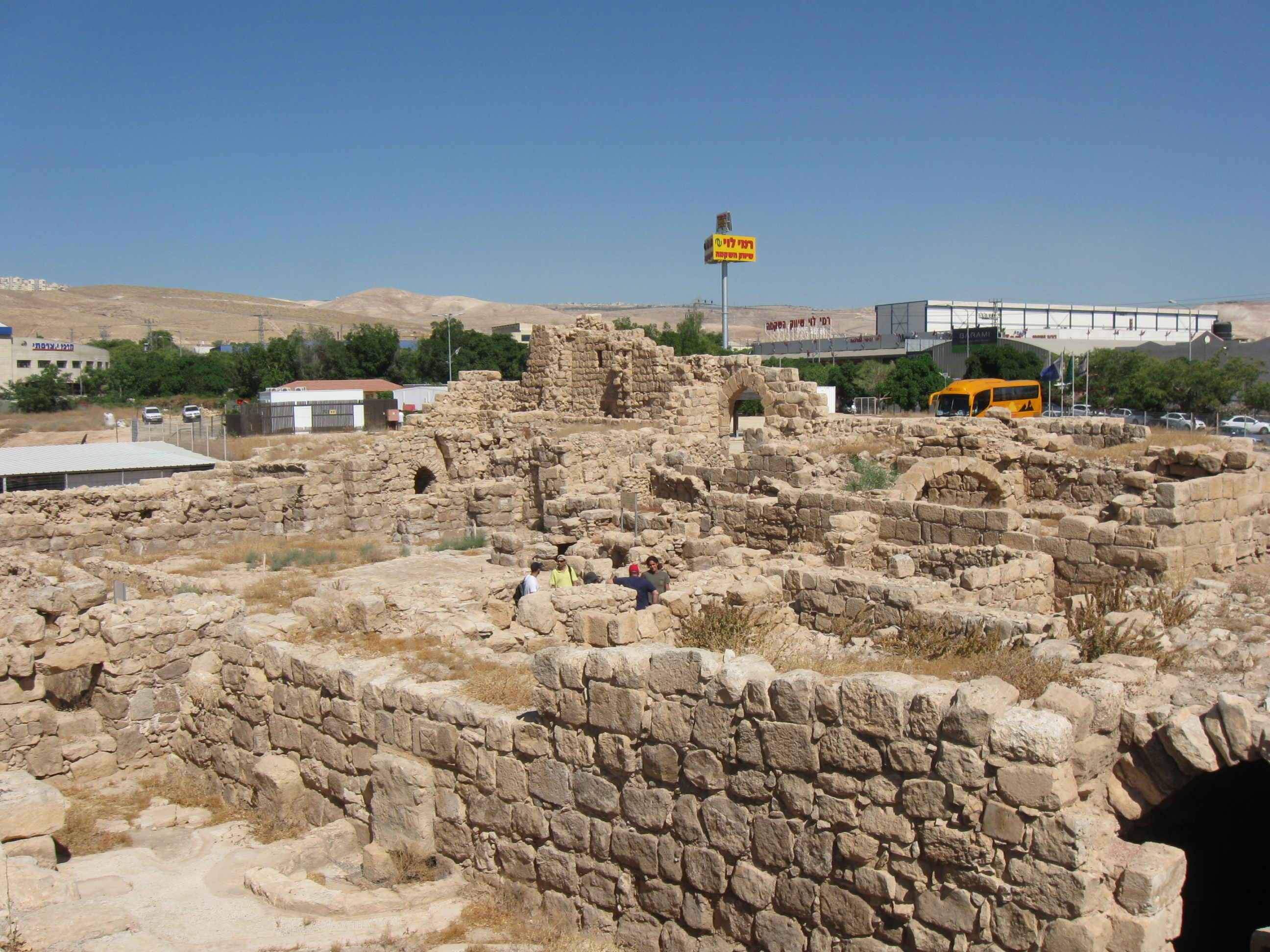
Lavra of St. Euthymius, later Khan al-Ahmar

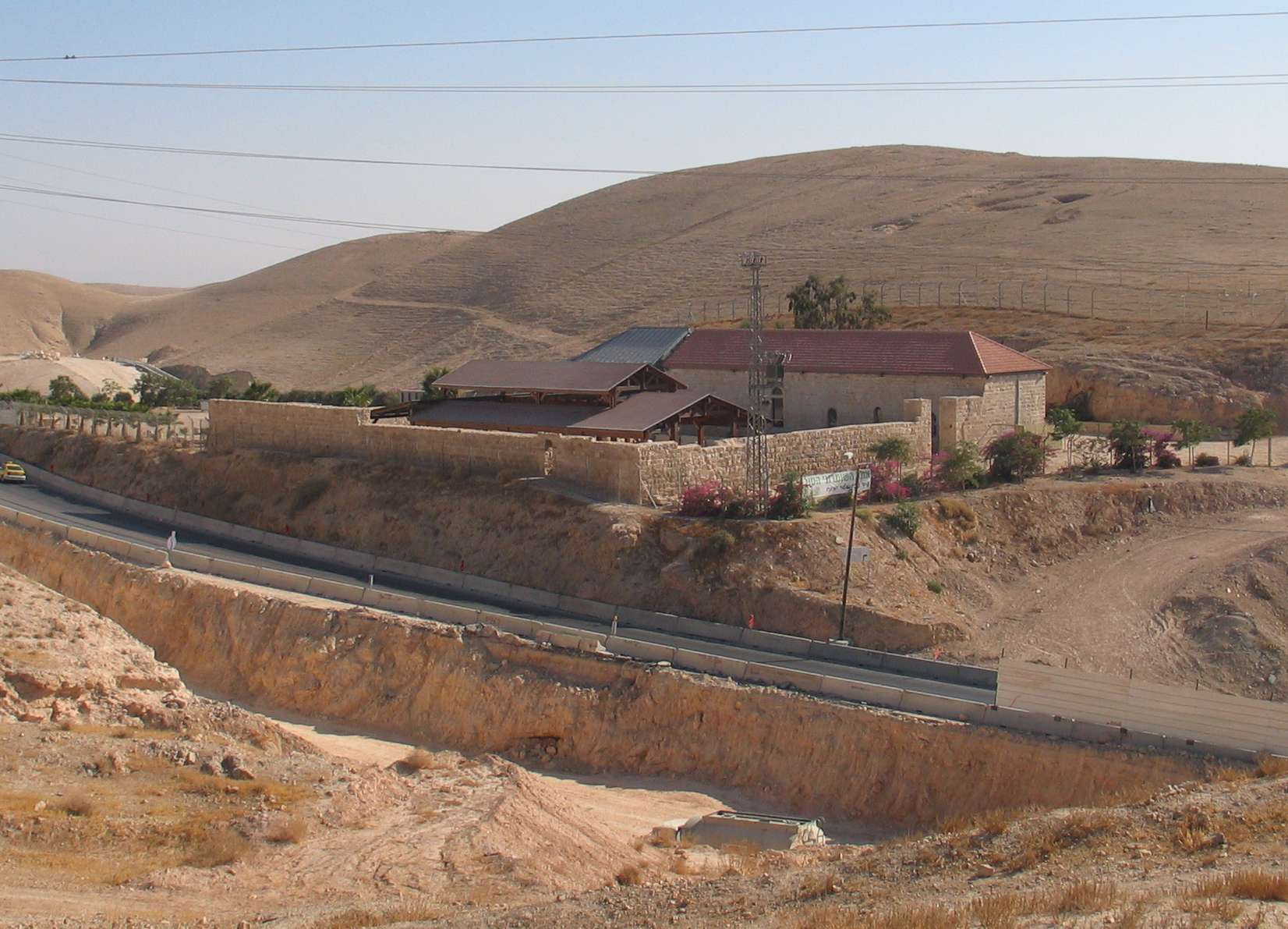
The Good Samaritan Inn (Khan al-Hatruri, seldom: Khan al-Ahmar)

=== Name ===
Khan al-Ahmar means "Red Caravanserai", where khan is an originally Persian word for caravanserai. The "red" part of the name comes from the red colour given off by the iron-oxide-tinged limestone forming the red-brown hills of the area on the road descending from Jerusalem to Jericho.

There are several Bedouin encampments in the area with one larger one, collectively known as Khan al-Ahmar, after the nearby former caravansary.

=== Laura of Euthymius (Khan al-Ahmar) ===
The khan after which the Bedouin village is named was built in the 13th century on the site of the Lavra (monastery) of St. Euthymius, after its destruction by the Mamluk sultan Baybars. The monastery had also included an inn, and the later khan developed on the remains of the 5th-century lavra.

=== Khan al-Hatruri (Inn of the Good Samaritan) ===
Another khan, the Good Samaritan Inn, known in Arabic both as Khan al-Hatruri, and sometimes, quite confusingly (see the other khan mentioned above), as Khan al-Ahmar, stands 4 kilometres (2.5 mi) east of the Highway 1-Route 417 junction. The restored complex holds a museum of mosaics excavated by Israeli archaeologists in the Palestinian areas, and a wing dedicated to the history and customs of the Samaritans.

== Bibliography ==
- Government of Palestine, Department of Statistics (1945). Village Statistics, April, 1945.
- Hadawi, S. (1970). Village Statistics of 1945: A Classification of Land and Area ownership in Palestine. Palestine Liberation Organization Research Center. Archived from the original on 8 December 2018.
- Mills, E., ed. (1932). Census of Palestine 1931. Population of Villages, Towns and Administrative Areas. Jerusalem: Government of Palestine.
