= Jerusalem J1 =

District in Palestine

The Jerusalem J1 is a sub-district of Jerusalem governorate of Palestine
