= Adnan Ghaith =

Palestinian politician (born 1970s)

Adnan Adel Tawfiq Ghaith
- عدنان غيث

Governor of Quds Governorate
- Incumbent
- Assumed office August 2018
- Preceded by: Adnan al-Husayni

Personal details
- Born: Palestine
- Party: Fatah
- Occupation: Politician, activist

Adnan Adel Tawfiq Ghaith (Arabic: عدنان غيث; born 1970s) is a member of Fatah's Revolutionary Council and is the Palestinian Authority's (PA) governor for the Quds Governorate since August 2018. He has been a life-long Fatah activist and lives in Jerusalem's Silwan neighbourhood in the West Bank.

Ghaith was the Fatah movement secretary in Silwan and one of the leaders of the People's Committee in the Al-Bustan neighbourhood of Jerusalem which has led local opposition to the "City of David" archaeological-tourist park. Because of his position and activities he has been arrested several times by Israel.

In 2011, Ghaith, at the time Fatah Secretary-General, was banned from entering Jerusalem for eight months.

On November 25, 2018, Ghaith was arrested along with 40 other members of the Fatah movement but released only a week later. His lawyer claimed that the Israeli authorities tried to harass him. His previous arrest was in October. He was subsequently banned from entering the Israeli-occupied West Bank for six months.

In February 2020, Ghaith was again banned from the West Bank for six months.

In July 2020, Ghaith was again arrested and was, according to his lawyers, investigated, over "planning an act of terrorism" but then released on August 4, 2020. It was his third arrest in 2020 and his 17th since he was appointed governor in 2018. In September, Israel issued him an order preventing him from meeting with many PA officials, including President Mahmoud Abbas and Prime Minister Mohammed Shtayyeh.

== See also ==
- Quds Governorate
