= Adnan al-Husayni =

Palestinian politician (born 1946)

Adnan Ghaleb al-Husayni
- عدنان غالب الحسيني
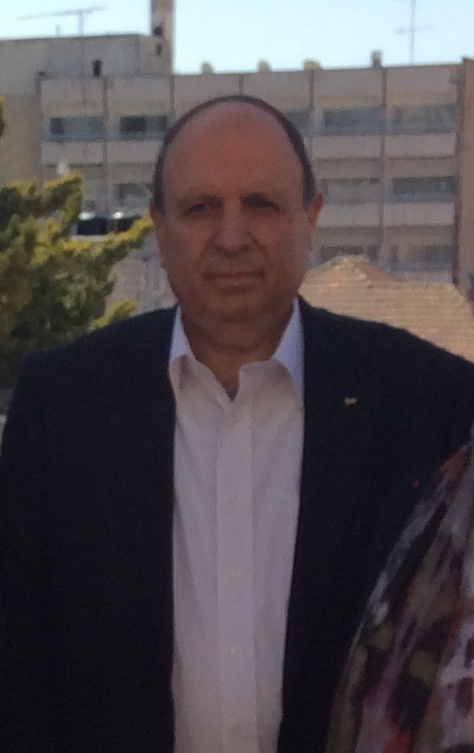
- al-Husayni in 2015

Governor of Quds Governorate
- In office 2008–2018
- Preceded by: Jamil Othman Nasser
- Succeeded by: Adnan Ghaith

Waqf Supervisor

Member of the Palestinian National Authority Higher Council of Tourism
- In office 1999–?

Personal details
- Born: 1946 (age 79–80) Jerusalem, Palestine
- Education: Ain Shams University
- Occupation: Architect, politician, Waqf supervisor

Adnan Ghaleb al-Husayni (Arabic: عدنان غالب الحسيني; born 1946) is a Palestinian politician, who was the Palestinian governor of Jerusalem and of the Quds Governorate between 2008 and 2018 when he was succeeded by Adnan Ghaith. He is also Waqf supervisor and a member of the Palestinian National Authority Higher Council of Tourism. He belongs to the al-Husayni family of Jerusalem, where he was born.

== History ==
In 1971, al-Husayni received a BA in architecture from Ain Shams University in Cairo, Egypt. Afterwards he began working as General-Manager and Supervisor of the Jerusalem Islamic Waqf. He served as head of the Palestinian Housing Council in Palestinian territories in 1999–2002. Since 1999, he has been a member of the Higher Council of Tourism.
