= Jerusalem J2 =

The Jerusalem J2 is a sub-district of Jerusalem governorate of Palestine.
