= As-Sawahira ash-Sharqiya =

as-Sawahira ash Sharqiya
- Municipality type C

Arabic transcription(s)
  - Arabic: السواحرة الشرقية
  - Latin: as-Sawahira ash Sharqiya (official) al-Sawahira al-Sharqiyya; Al-Sawahreh al-Sharqiyeh; a-Sawahrah a-Sharqiya (unofficial)
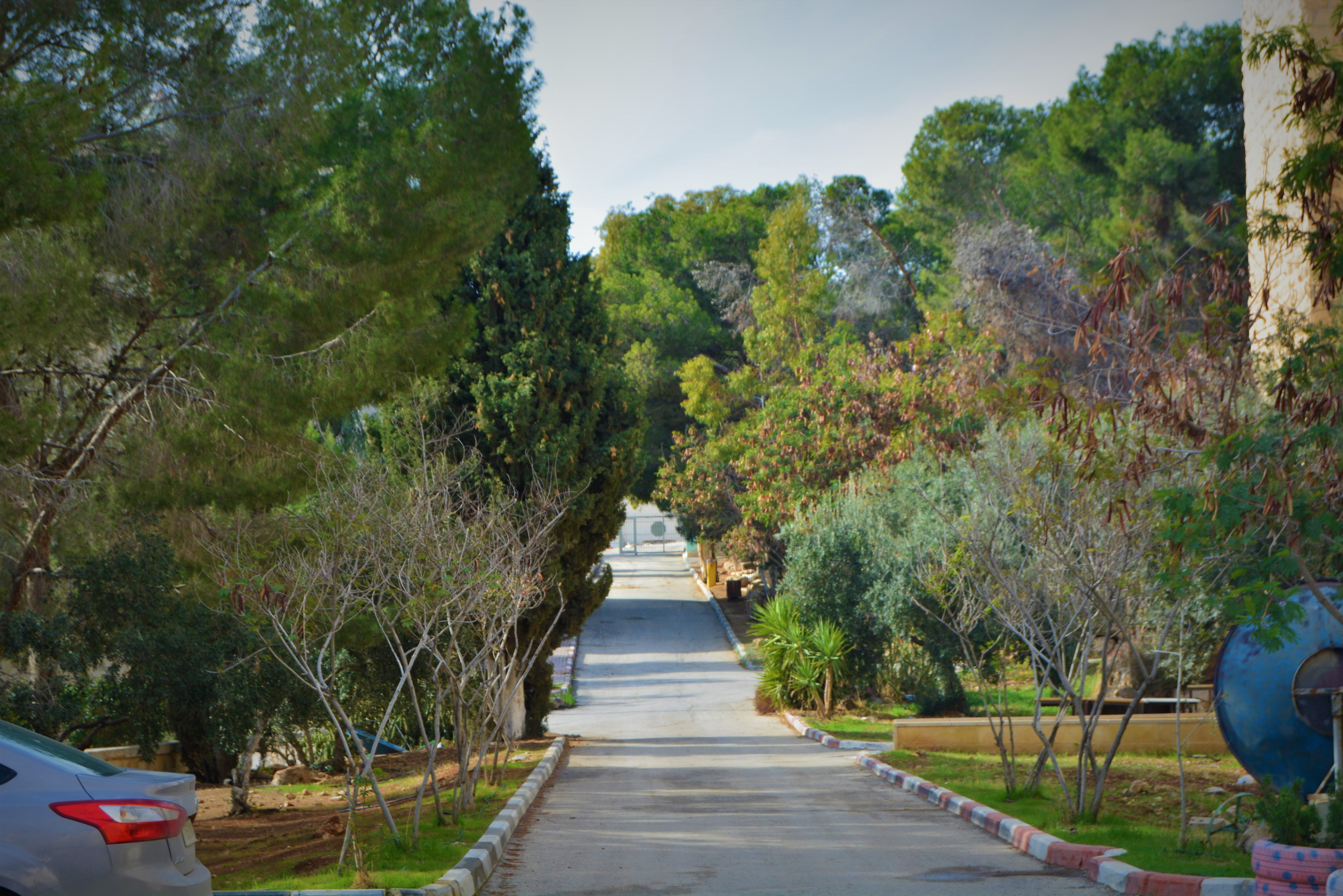

- Location of as-Sawahira ash Sharqiya within Palestine
- Coordinates: 31°44′37″N 35°16′7″E
- State: State of Palestine
- Governorate: Quds

Government
  - Type: Municipality

Population (2017)
  - Total: 6,204

as-Sawahira ash Sharqiya (Arabic: السواحرة الشرقية) or Al-Sawahreh al-Sharqiyeh is a Palestinian town in the Jerusalem Governorate, located 6 kilometers south-east of East Jerusalem in the West Bank. According to the Palestinian Central Bureau of Statistics (PCBS), as-Sawahira ash Sharqiya had a population of 6,204 inhabitants in 2017. as-Sawahira ash Sharqiya shares the facilities, particularly schools and health amenities of the villages of Jabal Mukaber and ash-Sheikh Sa'd. The healthcare facilities for as-Sawahira ash Sharqiya are designated as Ministry of Health level 2.

== History ==
In 1961, under Jordanian rule, the population was 279.

=== 1967–today ===
Since the Six-Day War in 1967, As-Sawahira ash-Sharqiya has been under Israeli occupation.

After the 1995 accords, 0.5% (or 335 dunums) of As-Sawahira ash-Sharqiya land was classified as Area A; 7.2% (or 5,005 dunums) as Area B; while the remaining 92.3% (or 63,902 dunums) was classified as Area C.

Israel has confiscated land from As-Sawahira ash-Sharqiya in order to construct two Israeli settlements:

- 955 dunams for Kalya,
- 45 dunams for Kedar.

== Bibliography ==
- Government of Jordan, Department of Statistics (1964). First Census of Population and Housing. Volume I: Final Tables; General Characteristics of the Population (PDF).
