= Jerusalem Governorate =

Governorate of Palestine

Coordinates: 31.8°N 35.3°E

- Governorate
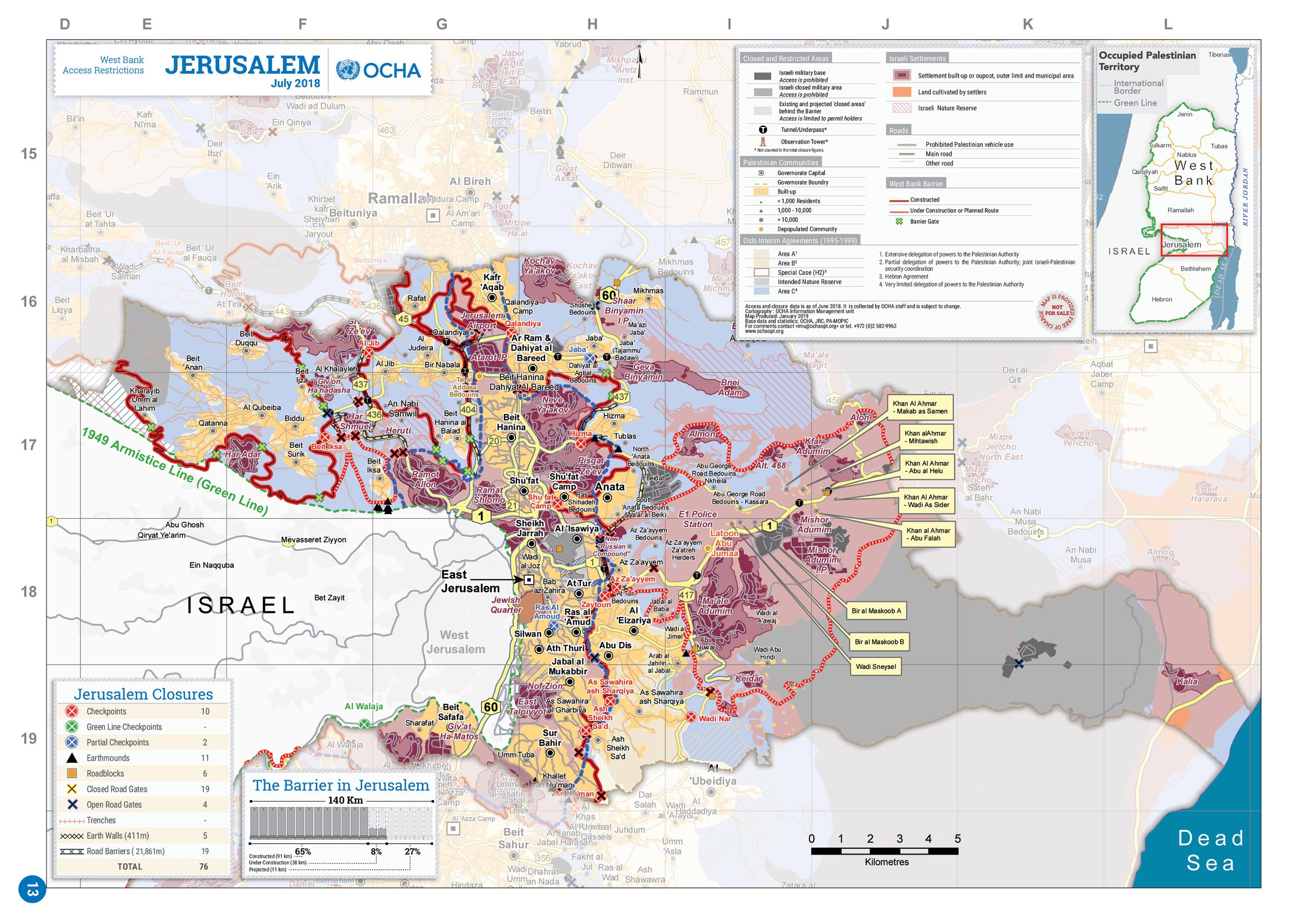
- 2018 United Nations map of the area, showing the Israeli occupation arrangements in the governorate

- Country: Palestine

Area
  - Total: 344 km^{2} (133 sq mi)

Population (2017)
  - Total: 435,483
- This figure excludes the Israeli West Bank Settlements

The Jerusalem Governorate (Arabic: محافظة القدس, romanized: Muḥāfaẓat al-Quds), also known as the Quds Governorate, is one of the 16 governorates of Palestine and located in the central part of the West Bank. The current governor, appointed by the Palestinian National Authority, is Adnan Ghaith since 2018, who succeeded Adnan al-Husayni, appointed in 2008. The Governorate has two sub-districts: Jerusalem J1, which includes the localities within the territory controlled by the Israeli Jerusalem municipality (East Jerusalem), and Jerusalem J2, which includes the remaining parts of the Jerusalem Governorate. The district capital of the Governorate is East Jerusalem (al-Quds).

The total land area of the governorate is 344 km^{2}. According to the Palestinian Central Bureau of Statistics, the governorate had a population of 429,500 residents in 2005, accounting for 10.5% of Palestinians living in the Palestinian territories in 2022 population had risen to 482,854 as official Statistics.

== Division ==
The Jerusalem Governorate is divided into the sub-districts "Jerusalem J1" and "Jerusalem J2". Jerusalem J1 comprises the parts of the West Bank that were annexed by Israel in 1980 and included within the Israeli municipality Jerusalem. Jerusalem J1 is usually referred to as East Jerusalem. Jerusalem J2 comprises the parts of the Governorate that are not included in J1.

=== Division by sub-district ===
Jerusalem J1: Al-Isawiya, Al-Quds (Jerusalem), Ash-Shayyah, As-Sawahira Al-Gharbiya, As-Suwwana, At-Tur, Ath-Thuri, Bab As-Sahira, Beit Hanina, Beit Safafa, Jabal Al-Mukabbir, Kufr A’qab, Ras Al-Amud, Sharafat, Sheikh Jarrah, Shu’fat, Shu'fat Refugee Camp, Silwan, Sur Baher, Umm Tuba, Wadi Al-Joz

Jerusalem J2: Abu Dis, Al-Eizariya (Bethany), Al-Jib, Al-Judeira, Al-Qubeiba, Al-Ram, As-Sawahira ash-Sharqiya, 'Anata, An-Nabi Samwil, Ash-Sheikh Sa’d, Az-Za’eem, Beit Anan, Beit Hanina al-Balad, Beit Ijza, Beit Iksa, Beit Surik, Biddu, Beit Duqqu, Bir Nabala, Dahiat Al-Bareed, Hizma, Jaba’, Khirbet Umm Al-Lahem, Mikhmas, Qalandya, Qalandya Refugee Camp, Qatanna, Rafat, the Bedouin community Al-Khan Al-Ahmar, the Bedouin community Jaba’, other Bedouin communities (see Bedouin village 'Arab al-Jahalin).

Municipal boundary in East Jerusalem with localities of Jerusalem J1 in light green

=== Division by locality type ===
==== Cities ====
- Abu Dis
- Al-Eizariya (Bethany)
- Al-Quds (Jerusalem)
- Ar-Ram

==== Municipalities ====
- Biddu
- Beit 'Anan
- Bir Nabala
- Hizma
- Kafr Aqab
- Qatanna
- Qalandiya

==== Village councils ====
- 'Anata
- Arab al-Jahalin
- Beit 'Anan
- Beit Duqqu
- Beit Hanina
- Beit Iksa
- Beit Sirik
- Jaba'
- Al-Jib
- Al-Judeira
- Kalandia
- Mikhmas
- Rafat
- As-Sawahira ash-Sharqiya
- Az-Za'ayyem

==== East Jerusalem neighborhoods ====
- Abu Tor
- Beit Hanina
- Beit Safafa
- Isawiya
- Jabal Mukabar
- Old City
- Ras al-Amud
- Sheikh Jarrah
- Shu'fat
- Silwan
- Sharafat
- Sur Baher
- At-Tur
- Umm Tuba
- Wadi al-Joz
- Al-Walaja (part of Bethlehem Governorate and East Jerusalem)

==== Palestinian controlled Jerusalem neighborhoods ====
- Sur Baher
- Beit Hanina
- Jabel Mukaber (ash-Sheikh Sa'd)
- Al-Ram
- Dahiyet Al Barid
- Kafr 'Aqab
- Arab al-Jahalin
- Umm Tuba
- Al-Walaja
- Anata
- Nabi Samwil

== Politics ==
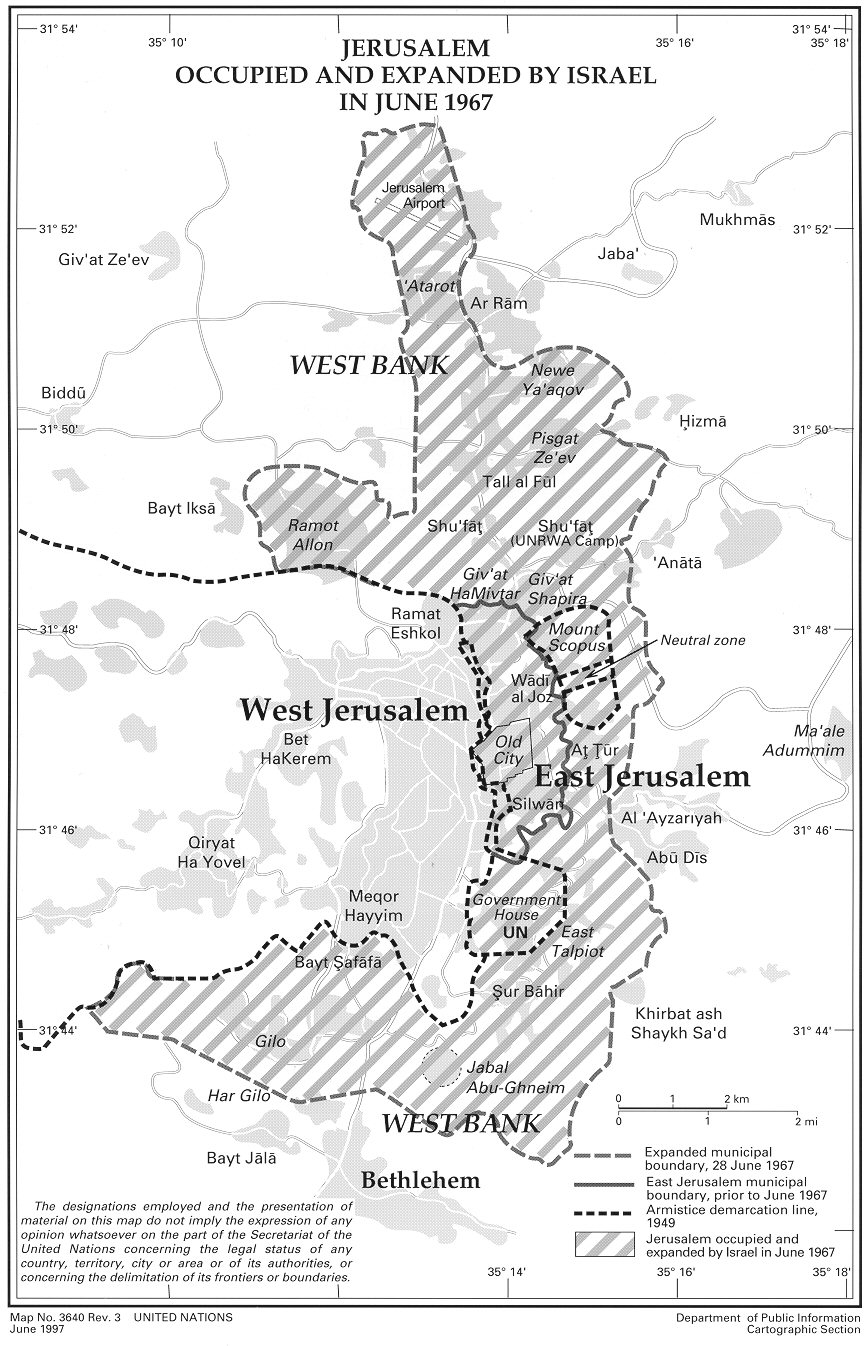
Expanded Jerusalem with Israeli municipal boundary of annexed area, 1967

Jerusalem was divided during the 1948 Arab–Israeli War. West Jerusalem came under Israeli rule and East Jerusalem, including the Old City, was ruled by Jordan until 1967. In the 1967 Six-Day War, Israel occupied the West Bank and unified the two parts of the city. East Jerusalem, along with other parts of the West Bank and West Jerusalem, were incorporated in one municipality. However, according to the Oslo Accords, East Jerusalem's Palestinian residents are allowed to participate in the PNA elections, and those that have Israeli citizenship can vote in the elections for the Knesset as well.

== Gallery ==
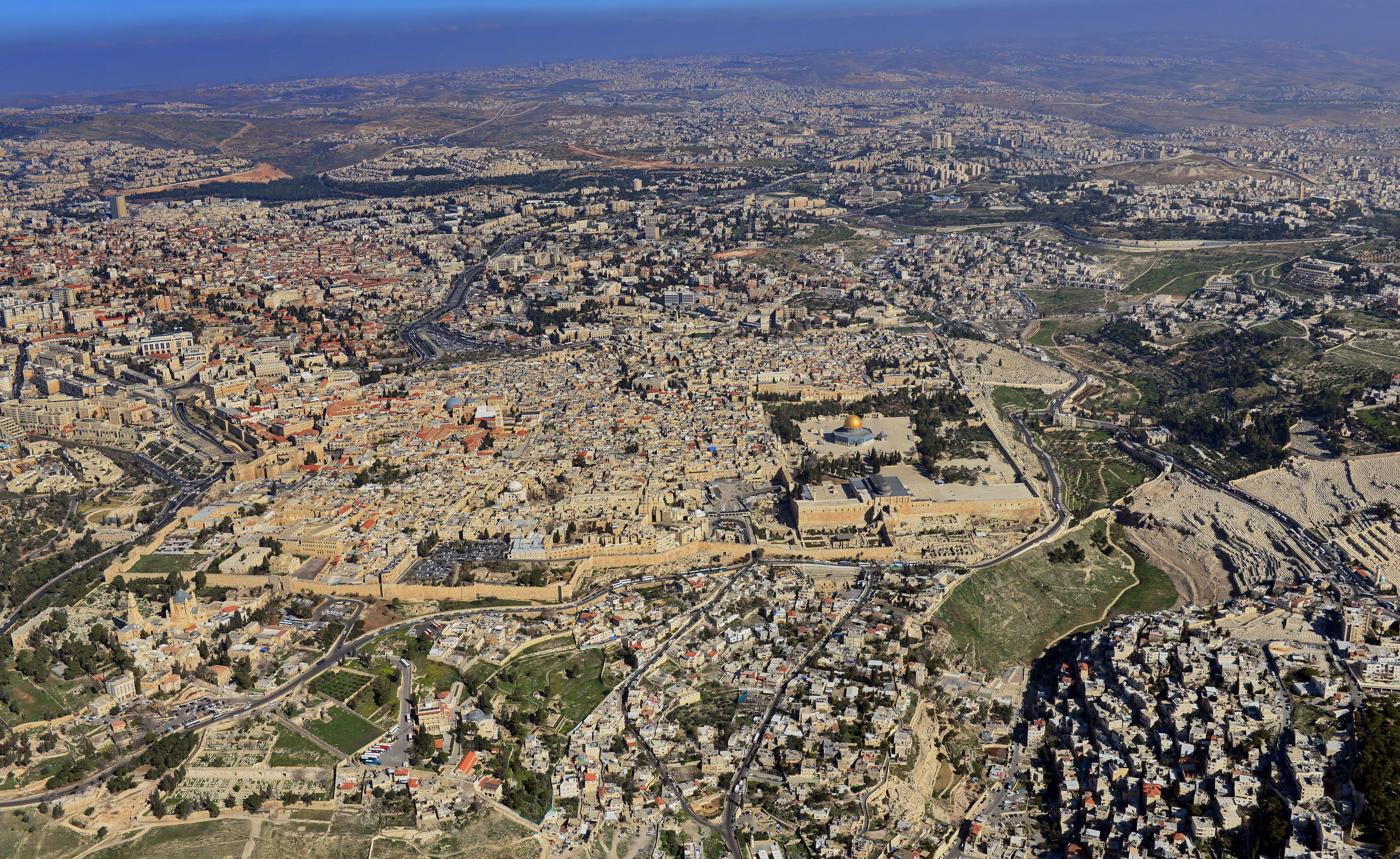
The walled old city of Jerusalem which is part of East Jerusalem and the Jerusalem governorate

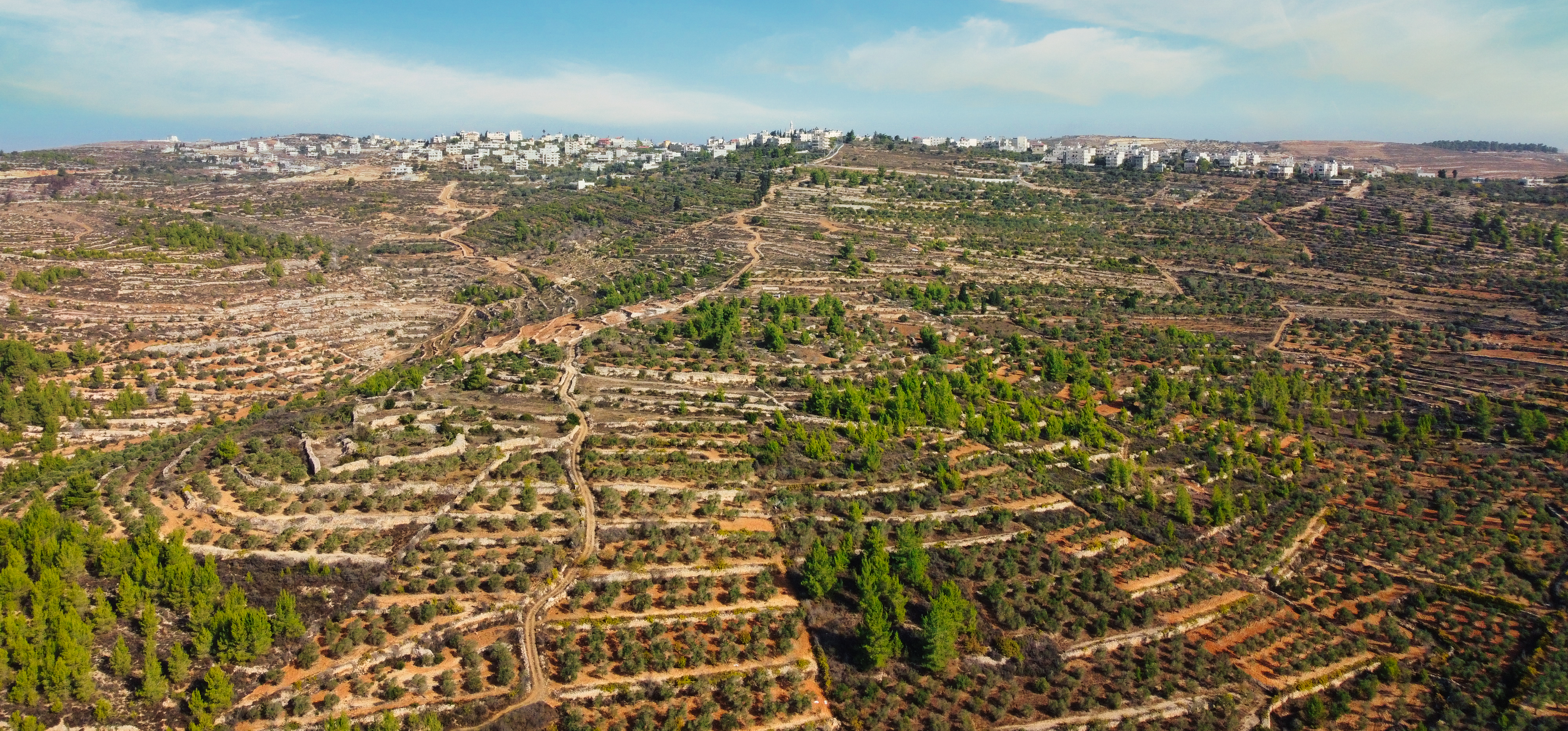
Beit Surik and its fields

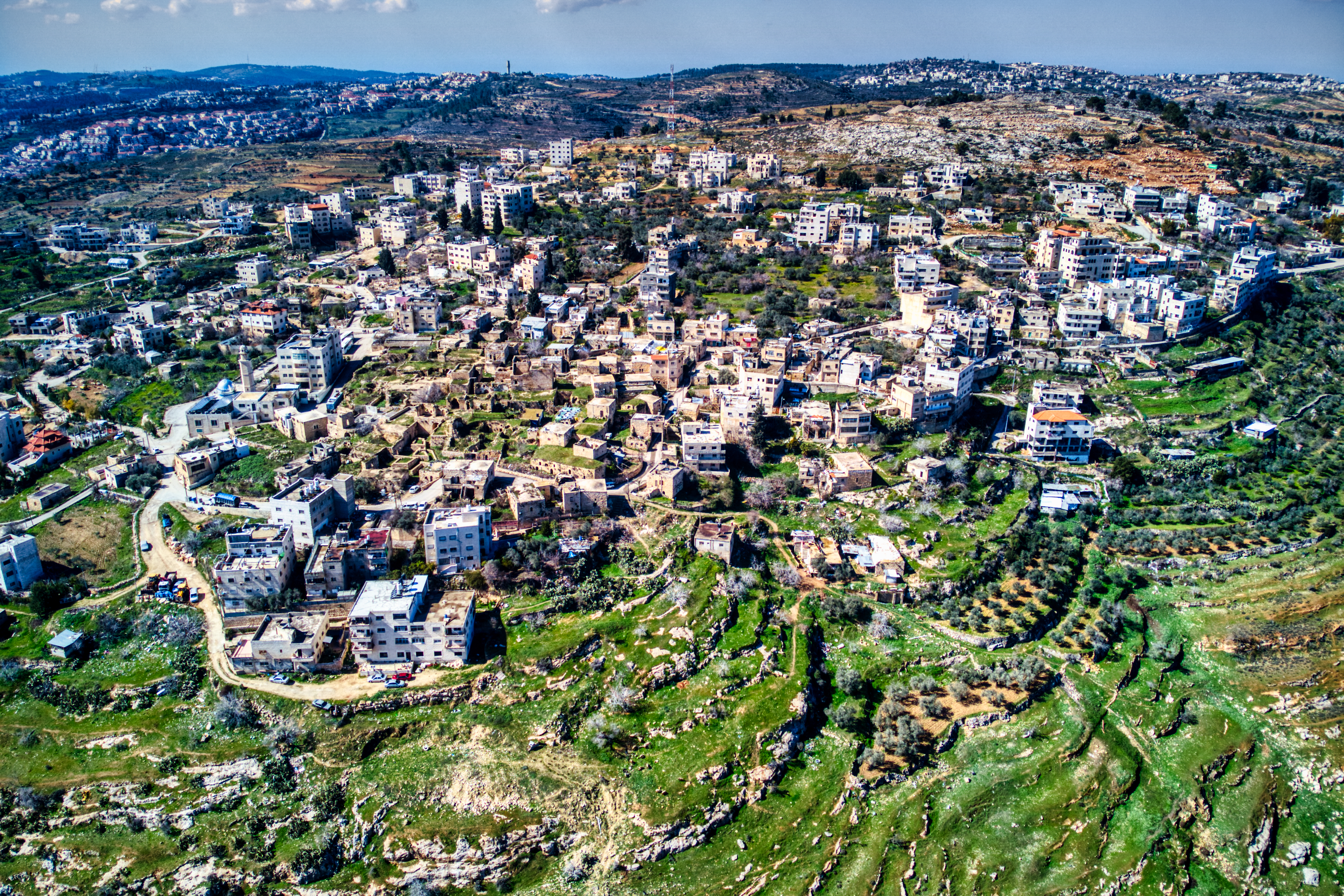
Beit Iksa

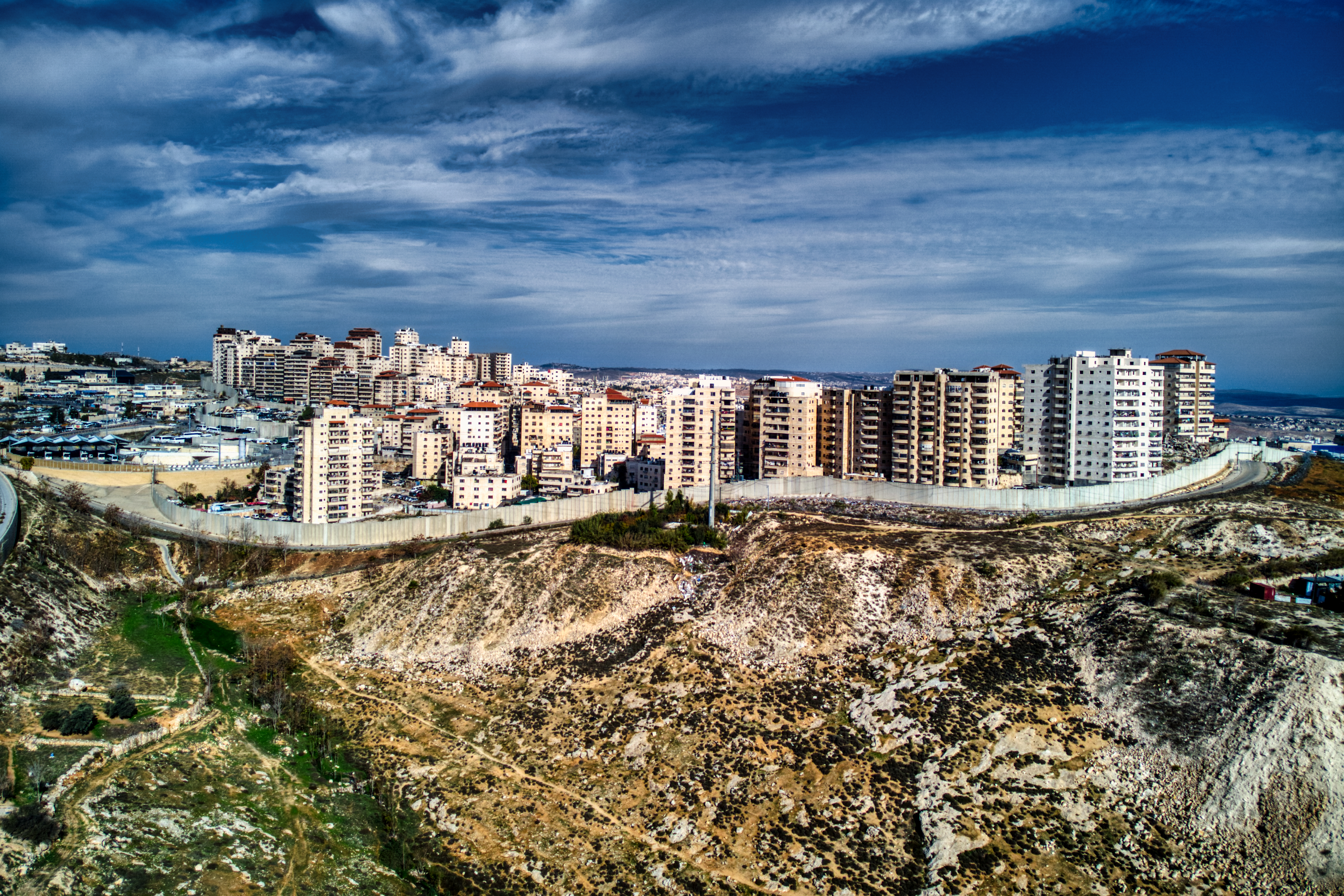
Shu'fat Camp

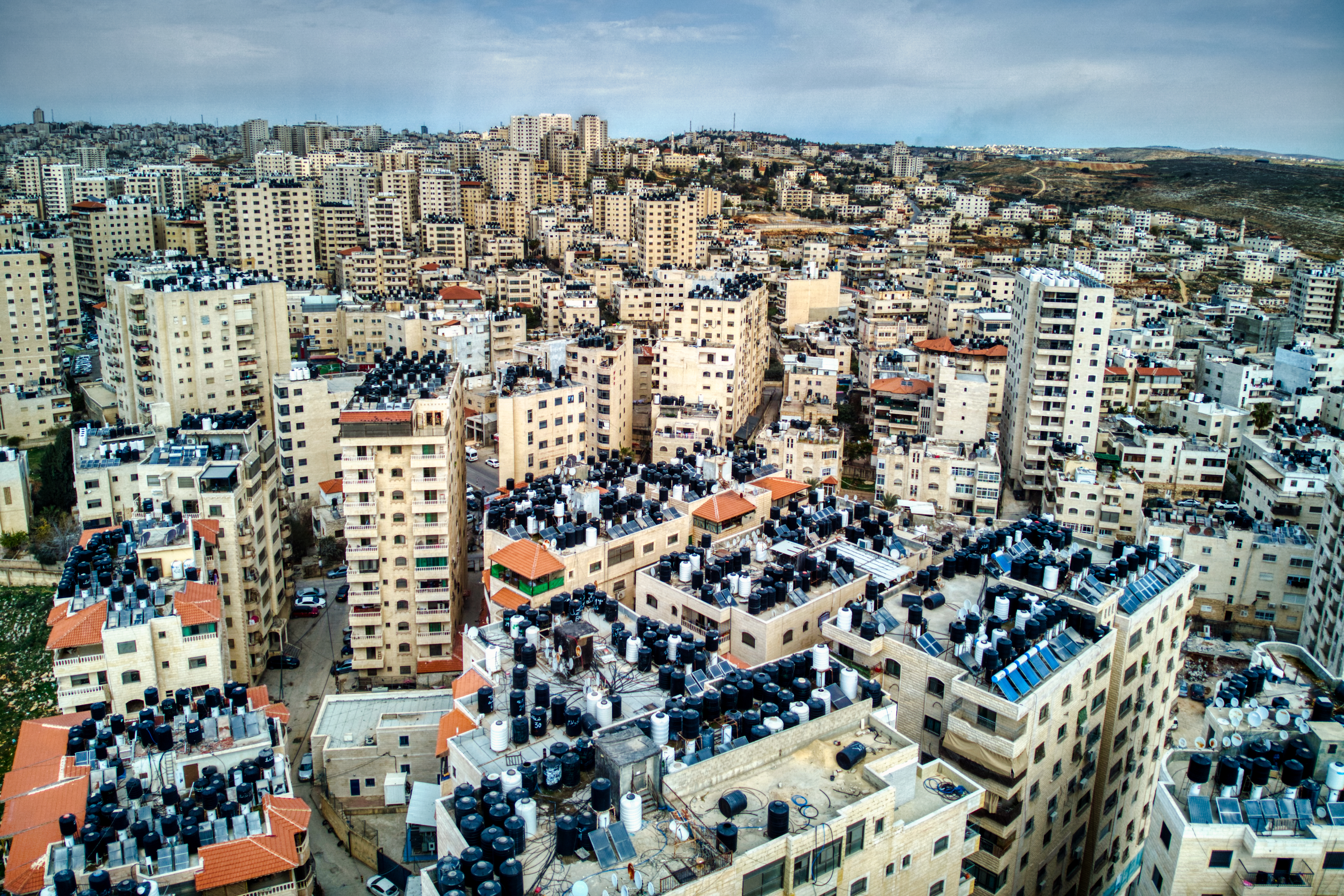
Kafr 'Aqab

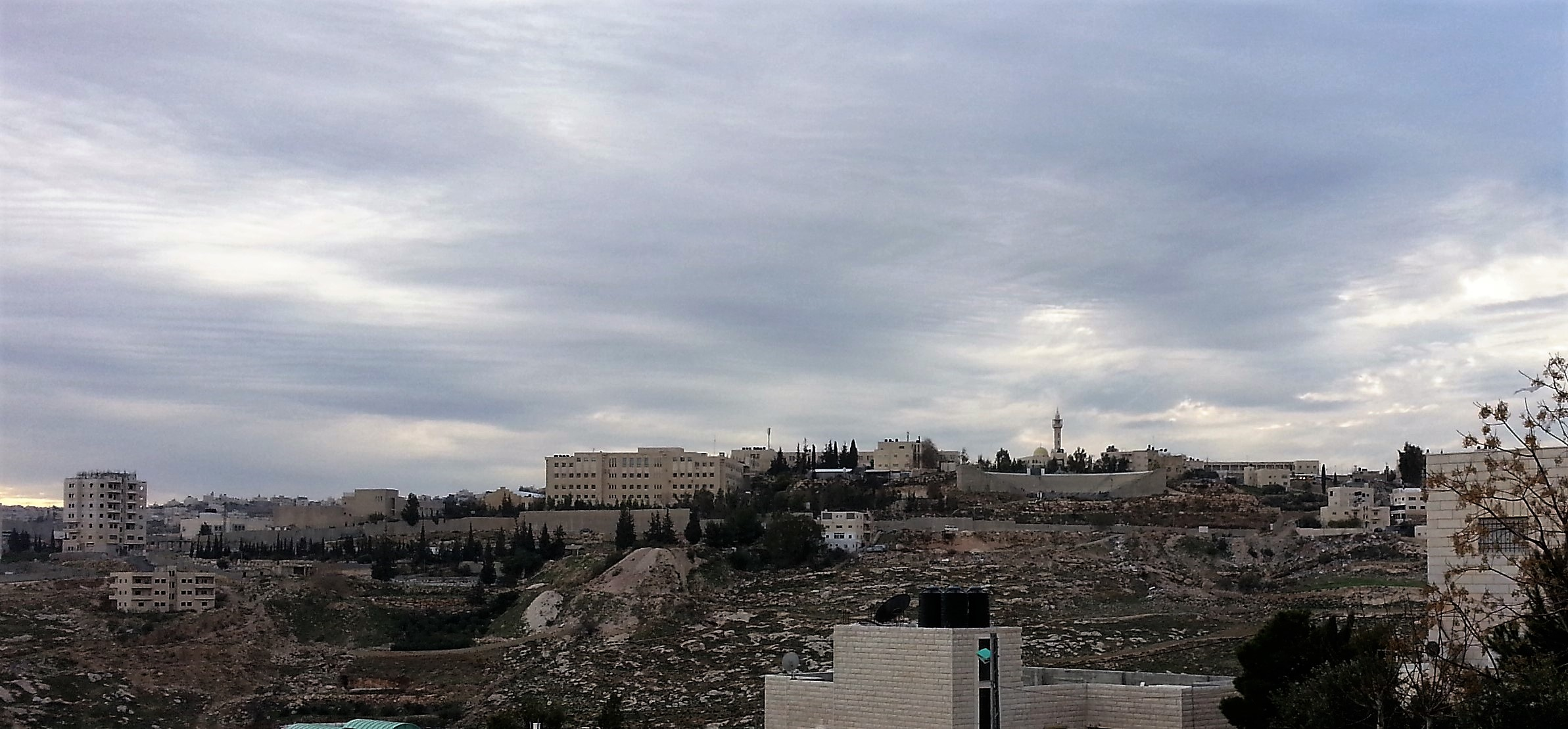
Abu Dis

== See also ==
- Positions on Jerusalem
- Jerusalem District
