= Jahalin Bedouin =

Bedouin tribe

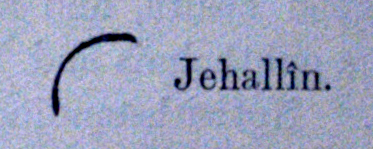
Tribal mark or Awsam of Jahalin bedouin. 1851.

The Jahalin Bedouin is a Palestinian and Lebanese tribe of Bedouin Arabs who currently live in the eastern Judaean Desert in the West Bank and Bekaa Valley of Lebanon

== History ==
=== South of Hebron (1875-1952) ===
In March 1875 Claude R. Conder, leader of the Palestine Exploration Fund survey team, reported the land south of Ain Jidy, close to Masada, belonged to the Jahalin. He met one of their sheikhs, Abu Dahuk, and noted the size and strength of their horses and their fondness for tobacco. He states that they had recently been driven from their country by Dhullam Arabs and mentions a war going on three hours from the team's camp at Bayt Jibrin. Earlier in the same year one of Conder's colleagues on the survey listed the Jahalin as numbering 150 men, with 100 tents, after noting the "utmost civility" of all Arabs, settled or Bedouin, from the Ghor area (the Jordan River and Dead Sea rift valley).

The Jahalin lived in the Tel Arad region of the Negev at the time of the creation of the state of Israel.

=== Near Jericho under Jordanian rule (1952-1967) ===
In 1952, the Jahalin were evicted from their lands by the Israeli army and they settled at a location southwest of Jericho, within the Jordanian-ruled West Bank. There, they took up their traditional seminomadic lifestyle, grazing livestock in the nearby area and the Jordan Valley.

=== Under Israeli occupation (1967-2014) ===
After the 1967 Israeli occupation of the West Bank, access to their grazing grounds was increasingly restricted by the Israeli military. The Jahalin were pushed into the vicinity of the Jerusalem‐Jericho road, where their settlement area became part of the municipality of Maale Adumim, an Israeli settlement established in the 1970s. The semi-permanent Jahalin encampments built until the 1980s contained at least two permanent structures.

=== Since 2014 eviction order ===
The tribe currently lives in villages such as ʿArab al-Jahalin, Wadi Abu Hindi, Al-Muntar, Al-Hathrura, Ghawaliya, Wadi Sneysel and Khan al-Ahmar east of Jerusalem, bordered by the Israeli settlements of Maale Adumim and Pisgat Ze’ev. On 16 September 2014 it was announced that they would be moved to a new area in the Jordan Valley north of Jericho.

On 17 April 2012 a documentary about the Jahalin, "Nowhere left to go" directed by Harvey Stein, was premiered at the French Cultural Centre, Jerusalem.

Since 2014, a football team made up of Jahalin Bedouin, the Desert Hawks, has been training and competing in the nearby Palestinian city of Bethlehem.
