= Rafat, Jerusalem =

Town in Jerusalem Governorate, West Bank

Rafat
- Municipality type D (Village council)

Arabic transcription(s)
  - Arabic: رافات
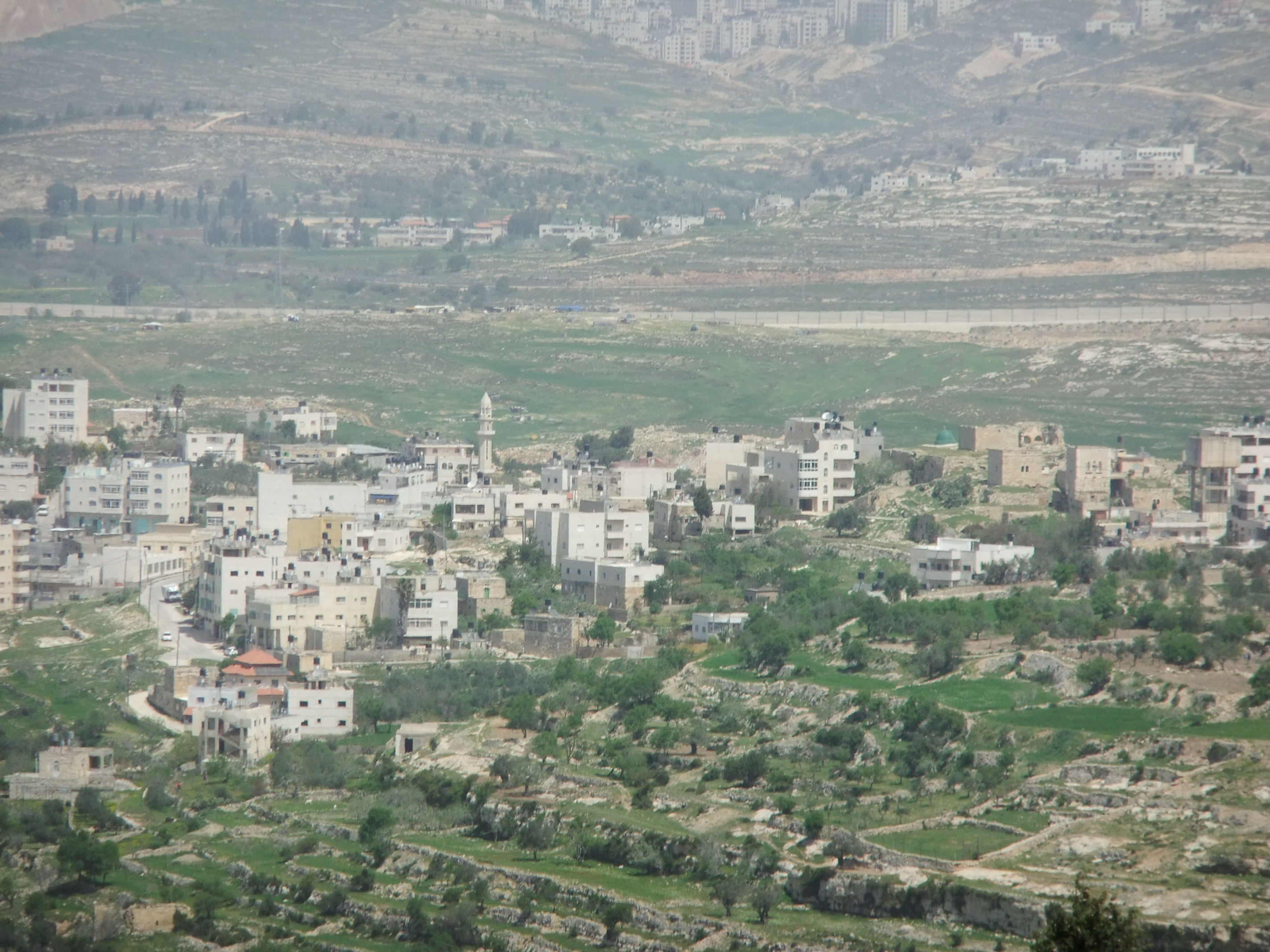
- Rafat

- Location of Rafat within Palestine
- Coordinates: 31°52′14″N 35°11′32″E
- Palestine grid: 168/141
- State: State of Palestine
- Governorate: Quds

Government
  - Type: Village council

Area
  - Total: 3.8 km^{2} (1.5 sq mi)
- Elevation: 753 m (2,470 ft)
- Highest elevation: 800 m (2,600 ft)
- Lowest elevation: 753 m (2,470 ft)

Population (2017)
  - Total: 2,941
  - Density: 770/km^{2} (2,000/sq mi)
- Name meaning: from personal name

Rafat (Arabic: رافات) is a Palestinian town in the Jerusalem Governorate of the State of Palestine, located approximately 4 km (2.5 mi) southwest of the city of Ramallah in the central West Bank. According to the Palestinian Central Bureau of Statistics, it had a population of 2,941 in 2017. Its total land area consists of 3,773 dunams.

== Location ==
Rafat is located 10.9 km (6.8 mi) northwest of Jerusalem. It is bordered by Qalandiya to the east, Al Judeira to the north, Ramallah to the west, and Beituniya to the south.

== History ==
Ceramics from the Byzantine era have been found here.

=== Ottoman era ===
Rafat, like the rest of Palestine, was incorporated into the Ottoman Empire in 1517, and in the census of 1596, the village was noted in the Nahiya of Quds of the Liwa of Quds. The population was 27 households, all Muslim. The villagers paid a fixed tax rate of 33.3% on various agricultural products, such as wheat, barley, summer crops, goats and/or beehives, in addition to "occasional revenues"; a total of 3,300 akçe.

In 1838, Rafat was noted as a Muslim village in the Jerusalem District. During this time, residents from Rafat settled Danyal near al-Ramla, establishing it as a dependency – or satellite village – of their home village.

In 1863, Victor Guérin found Rafat to have 120 inhabitants, and was located on a mound. It had a mosque dedicated to Sheikh Ahmed. He further noted that in some houses, several stones appeared to be ancient. In one house he found a fragment of a broken column.

An Ottoman village list from about 1870 showed that rafat had 35 houses and a population of 100, though the population count only included men.

In 1883, the PEF's Survey of Western Palestine (SWP) described Rafat as "a small hamlet on a ridge, with a spring to the west, and many rock cut tombs."

In 1896, the population of Rafat was estimated to be about 195 persons.

=== British Mandate era ===
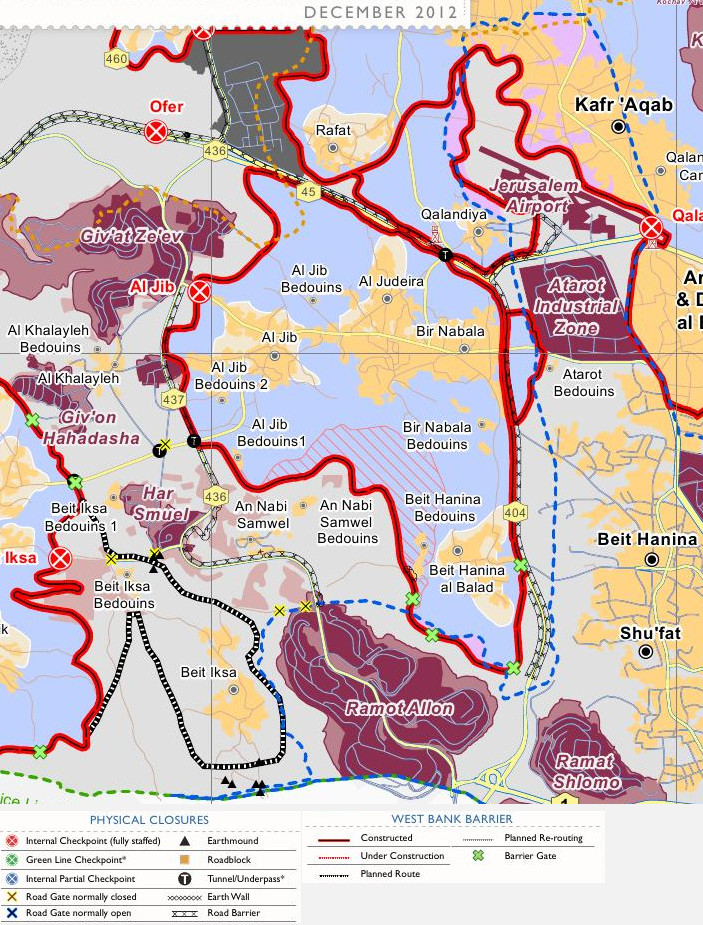
The barrier in northern Jerusalem, which confines Rafat village (in the north) to an enclave under Israeli control.

In the 1922 census of Palestine conducted by the British Mandate authorities, Rafat had a population of 219 Muslims. According to the 1931 census, Rafat had a population of 218 inhabitants in 46 houses. In the 1945 statistics, Rafat had a population of 280 Muslims, and a land area of 3,777 dunams. Of this, 252 dunams were designated for plantations and irrigable land, 1,965 dunams were for cereals, while 21 dunams were built-up.

=== Jordanian era ===
In the wake of the 1948 Arab–Israeli War, and after the 1949 Armistice Agreements, Rafat came under Jordanian rule.

In 1961, the population of Rafat was 504.

=== Post-1967 ===
Since the Six-Day War in 1967, Rafat has been under Israeli occupation. The population in the 1967 census conducted by the Israeli authorities was 499, 75% of whom originated from the Israeli territory.

According to ARIJ, Israel has confiscated 287 dunums of land (8.5% of the total area of the village) for the construction of Camp Ofer (later Ofer Prison). More land has been confiscated from Rafat for the construction of the Israeli West Bank barrier. 637 dunums, which comprises 18.7% of the village’s total area, is isolated behind the wall, on the Israeli side.

== Bibliography ==
- Barron, J.B., ed. (1923). Palestine: Report and General Abstracts of the Census of 1922. Government of Palestine.
- Conder, C.R.; Kitchener, H.H. (1883). The Survey of Western Palestine: Memoirs of the Topography, Orography, Hydrography, and Archaeology. Vol. 3. London: Committee of the Palestine Exploration Fund. (p. 154-155)
- Dauphin, C. (1998). La Palestine byzantine, Peuplement et Populations. BAR International Series 726 (in French). Vol. III : Catalogue. Oxford: Archeopress. ISBN 0-860549-05-4.
- Government of Jordan, Department of Statistics (1964). First Census of Population and Housing. Volume I: Final Tables; General Characteristics of the Population (PDF).
- Government of Palestine, Department of Statistics (1945). Village Statistics, April, 1945.
- Guérin, V. (1868). Description Géographique Historique et Archéologique de la Palestine (in French). Vol. 1: Judee, pt. 1. Paris: L'Imprimerie Nationale.
- Hadawi, S. (1970). Village Statistics of 1945: A Classification of Land and Area ownership in Palestine. Palestine Liberation Organization Research Center.
- Hartmann, M. (1883). "Die Ortschaftenliste des Liwa Jerusalem in dem türkischen Staatskalender für Syrien auf das Jahr 1288 der Flucht (1871)". Zeitschrift des Deutschen Palästina-Vereins. 6: 102–149.
- Hütteroth, W.-D.; Abdulfattah, K. (1977). Historical Geography of Palestine, Transjordan and Southern Syria in the Late 16th Century. Erlanger Geographische Arbeiten, Sonderband 5. Erlangen, Germany: Vorstand der Fränkischen Geographischen Gesellschaft. ISBN 3-920405-41-2.
- Mills, E., ed. (1932). Census of Palestine 1931. Population of Villages, Towns and Administrative Areas. Jerusalem: Government of Palestine.
- Palmer, E.H. (1881). The Survey of Western Palestine: Arabic and English Name Lists Collected During the Survey by Lieutenants Conder and Kitchener, R. E. Transliterated and Explained by E.H. Palmer. Committee of the Palestine Exploration Fund.
- Robinson, E.; Smith, E. (1841). Biblical Researches in Palestine, Mount Sinai and Arabia Petraea: A Journal of Travels in the year 1838. Vol. 2. Boston: Crocker & Brewster.
- Robinson, E.; Smith, E. (1841). Biblical Researches in Palestine, Mount Sinai and Arabia Petraea: A Journal of Travels in the year 1838. Vol. 3. Boston: Crocker & Brewster.
- Schick, C. (1896). "Zur Einwohnerzahl des Bezirks Jerusalem". Zeitschrift des Deutschen Palästina-Vereins. 19: 120–127.
- Socin, A. (1879). "Alphabetisches Verzeichniss von Ortschaften des Paschalik Jerusalem". Zeitschrift des Deutschen Palästina-Vereins. 2: 135–163.
- Toledano, E. (1984). "The Sanjaq of Jerusalem in the Sixteenth Century: Aspects of Topography and Population". Archivum Ottomanicum. 9: 279–319. Archived from the original on 2016-03-05.
