= Kedar (Israeli settlement) =

Israeli settlement in the West Bank

Kedar: קֵדָר (Hebrew)
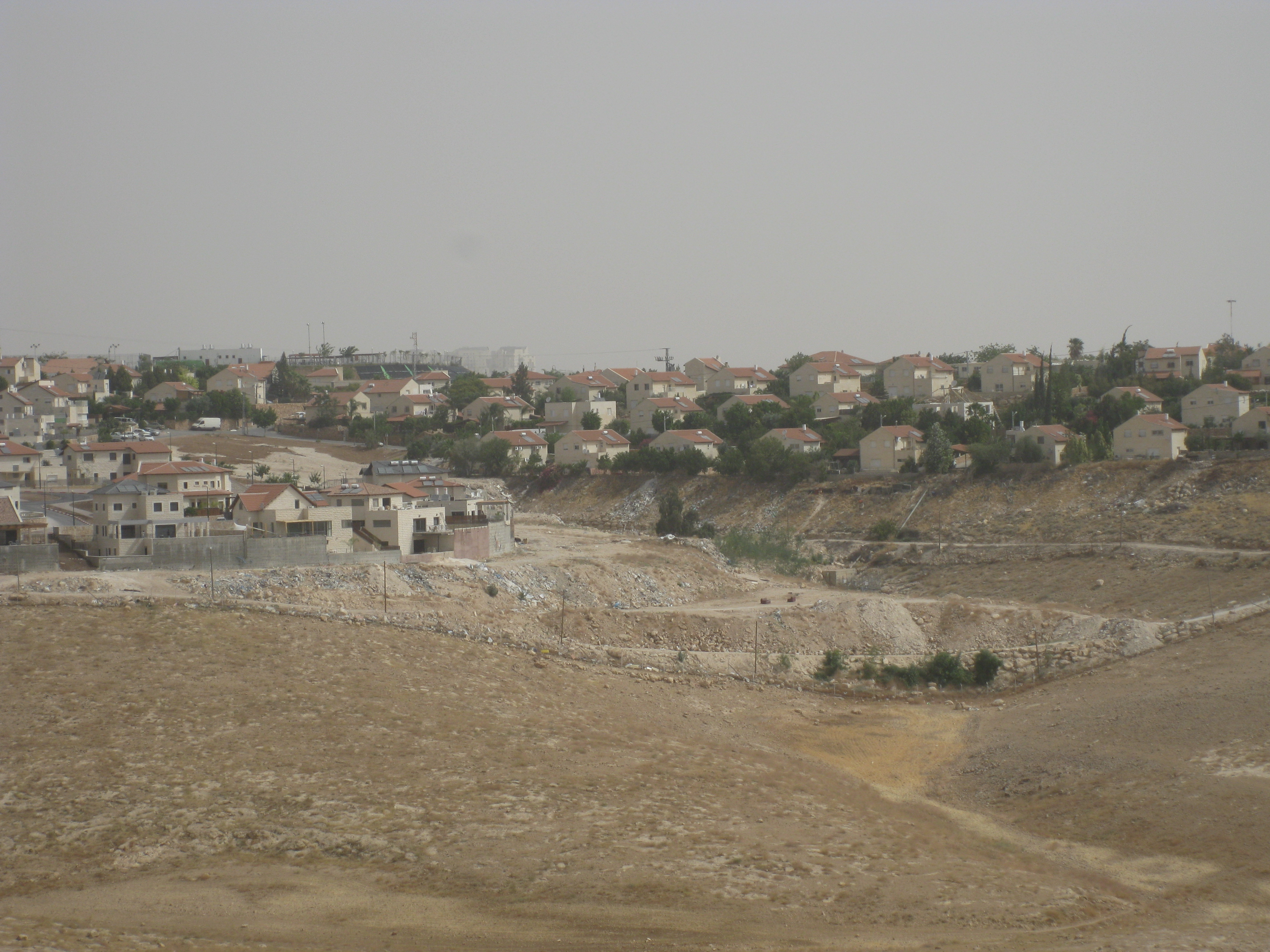

- Location within the Central West Bank
- Coordinates: 31°45′20″N 35°18′34″E
- Country: Palestine
- District: Judea and Samaria Area
- Council: Gush Etzion
- Region: West Bank
- Affiliation: Mishkei Herut Beitar
- Founded: 1984
- Founder: Betar movement
- Population (2024): 1,547

Kedar (Hebrew: קֵדָר) is a rural Israeli settlement in the West Bank. Located to the south of Ma'ale Adumim and organised as a community settlement, it falls under the jurisdiction of Gush Etzion Regional Council. In 2024 it had a population of 1,547.

The international community considers Israeli settlements in the West Bank illegal under international law, but the Israeli government disputes this.

== Name ==
The name is taken from the Song of Songs: "Dark am I, o daughters of Jerusalem, dark like the tents of Kedar" (Song of Songs 1:5).

== History ==
According to ARIJ, Israel confiscated 45 dunums of land in 1984 from the Palestinian village of as-Sawahira ash-Sharqiya in order to construct Kedar.

The council was established in 1984 by families linked to the Betar movement.

After Palestinian gunmen killed one Israeli and injured five Israelis near Ma'ale Adumim, Israel's far-right Finance Minister Bezalel Smotrich in February 2024 announced a "settlement response" after speaking to Prime Minister Benjamin Netanyahu and Defense Minister Yoav Gallant, as "any harm to us will lead to more construction and more development and more of our hold all over the country", with 300 more homes in Kedar being arranged for approval. American Secretary of State Antony Blinken criticized the announcement, stating that new Israeli settlements are "inconsistent with international law" and "counter-productive to reaching an enduring peace", risking "Israel’s security". Haaretz reported that Israel's government in March 2024 progressed the approval of 330 more settler homes in Kedar.
