= Ash-Sheikh Sa'd =

ash-Sheikh Sa'd
- Municipality type D (Village council)

Arabic transcription(s)
  - Arabic: خربة الشيخ سعد
- Location of ash-Sheikh Sa'd within Palestine
- Coordinates: 31°44′14″N 35°15′26″E
- State: State of Palestine
- Governorate: Quds

Government
  - Type: Village council

Population (2017)
  - Total: 2,776
- Name meaning: Sheik Sad -from "fortunate"

ash-Sheikh Sa'd (Arabic: خربة الشيخ سعد) is a Palestinian village in the Jerusalem Governorate, located 6 kilometers Southeast of Jerusalem in the central West Bank. According to the Palestinian Central Bureau of Statistics, the village had a population of 2,776 in 2017.

The village's residents have family in Jabel Mukaber, an Arab neighborhood in East Jerusalem, and attend school there. Sheikh Sa'd's cemetery is located in the neighborhood as well. Since the Second Intifada in 2000, Sheikh Sa'd residents have not been allowed to enter Jabel Mukaber without a permit.

== History ==
In 1838, it was noted as a "ruined" village in the el-Arkub District, south west of Jerusalem.

== Bibliography ==
- Palmer, E.H. (1881). The Survey of Western Palestine: Arabic and English Name Lists Collected During the Survey by Lieutenants Conder and Kitchener, R. E. Transliterated and Explained by E.H. Palmer. Committee of the Palestine Exploration Fund.
- Robinson, E.; Smith, E. (1841). Biblical Researches in Palestine, Mount Sinai and Arabia Petraea: A Journal of Travels in the year 1838. Vol. 3. Boston: Crocker & Brewster.
