= Har'el Interchange and Tunnels =

Freeway interchange in Israel

Coordinates: 31°47′36″N 35°08′38″E

Har'el Interchange and tunnels
- מחלף ומנהרות הראל
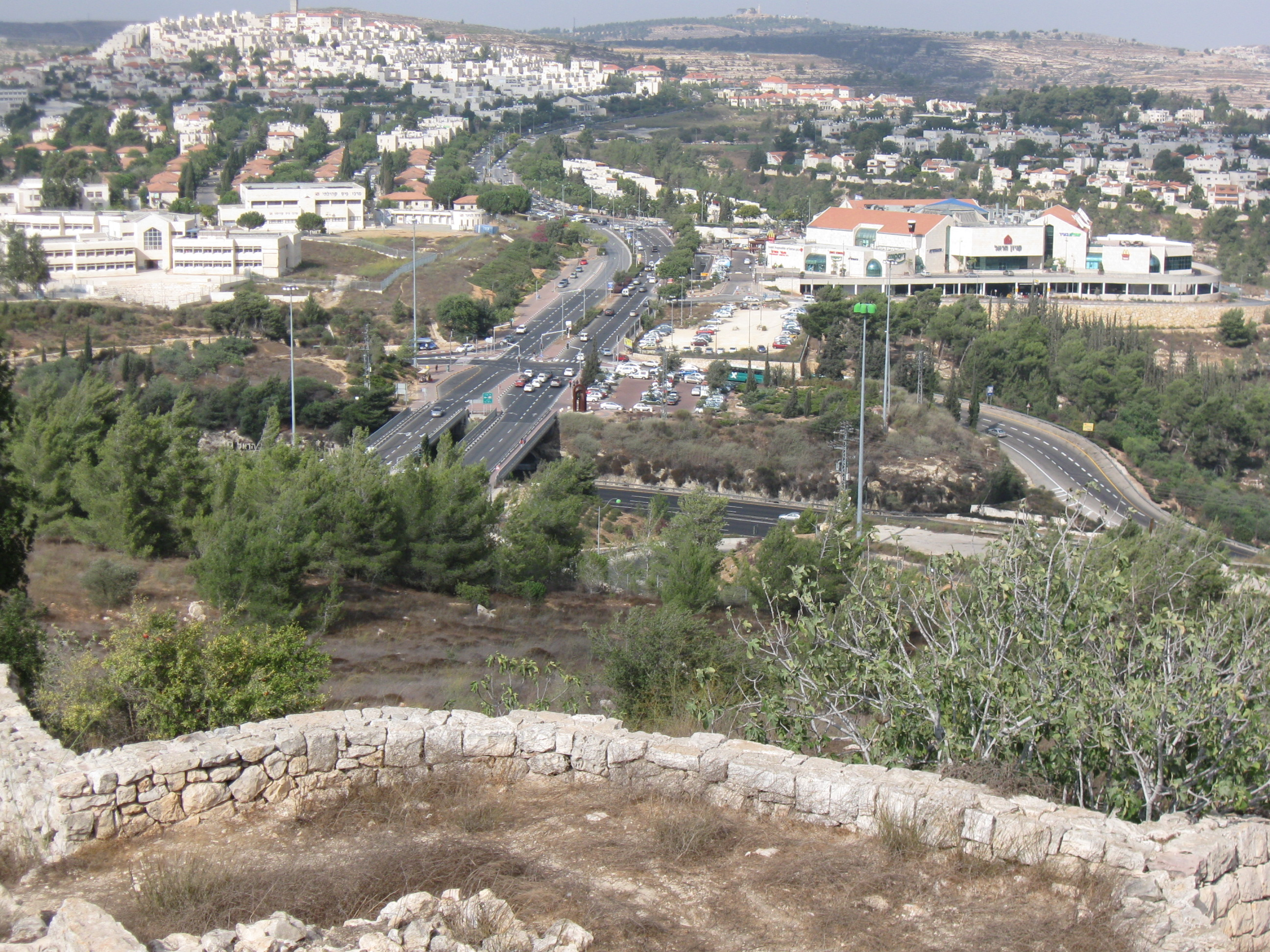
- Har'el Interchange as seen from the Qastal
- Interactive map of Har'el Interchange and tunnels

Location
- Mevaseret Zion
- Roads at junction: Highway 1 Road 3965

Construction
- Opened: 1971

The Har'el interchange was an interchange that connected Highway 1 and Road 3965 near the communities Mevaseret Zion and Motza Illit. The interchange was in the Diamond interchange type, whose bridge is built on the secondary road route and passes over Highway 1, where the traffic is continuous. The interchange opened to traffic in 1971, with the expansion project of Highway 1, which began in the late 1960s. The interchange is named after the Harel Brigade who fought in the area in the 1948 Palestine war.

The interchange is located at a high point on Route 1 near the Qastal site. The interchange bridge is based on a concrete bow that supports the upper road surface. In 1995, the road from Mevaseret Zion to Motza Illit was expanded by a second bridge building.

In 2010, the Israel National Planning and Building Council approved a plan to expand Highway 1. Two tunnels were built, about 850 meters each, under the Harel interchange. The estimated project was supposed to be in 2015, but its inauguration was postponed to the beginning of 2017. The inauguration of the tunnel was on January 20, 2017.

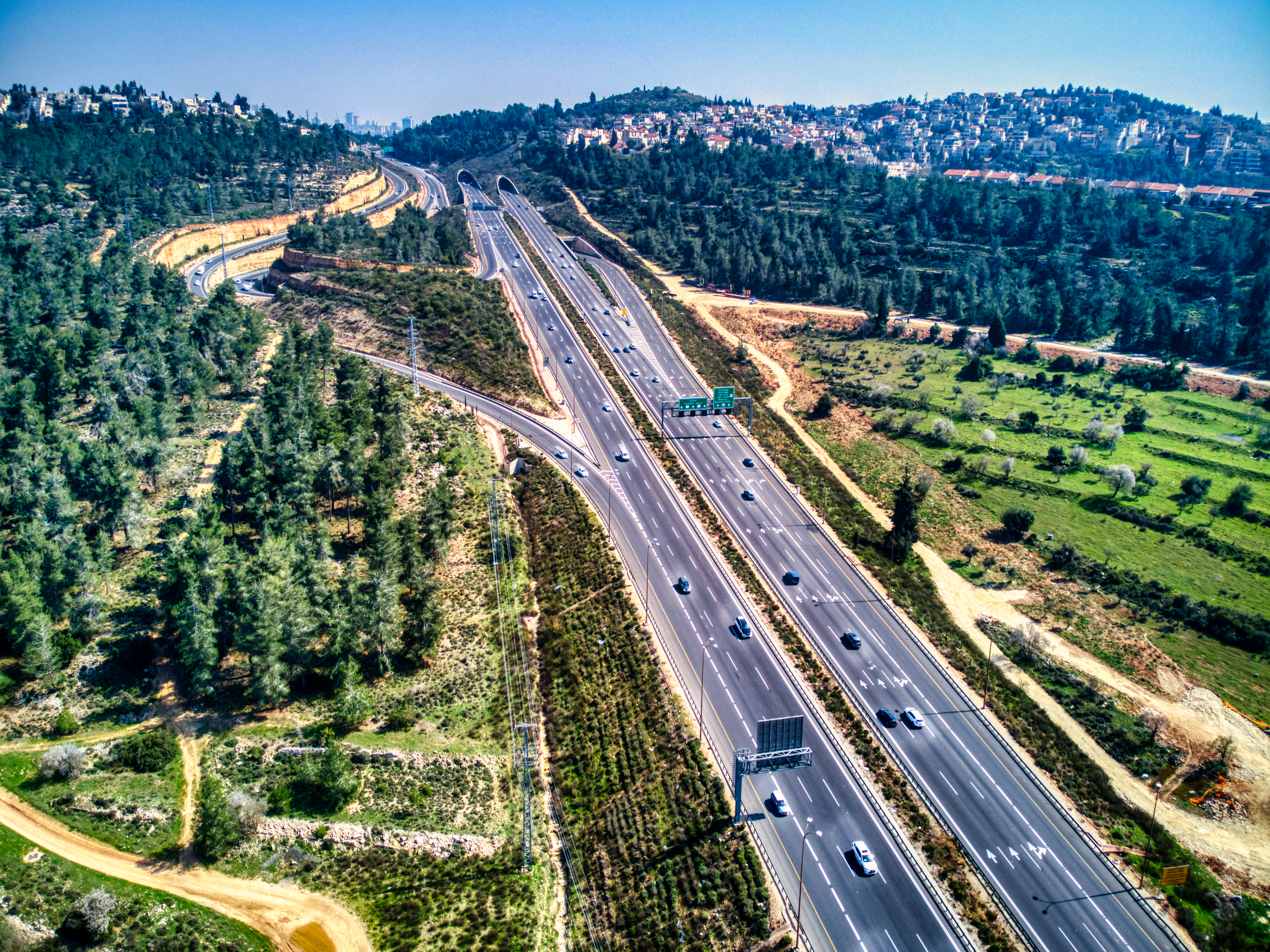
The entrance to Har'el Tunnels
