= Mevaseret Zion =

Mevaseret Zion מְבַשֶּׂרֶת צִיּוֹן
- Local council

Hebrew transcription(s)
  - ISO 259: Mbaśśert Çiyon
  - Also spelled: Mevasseret Ziyyon (official)
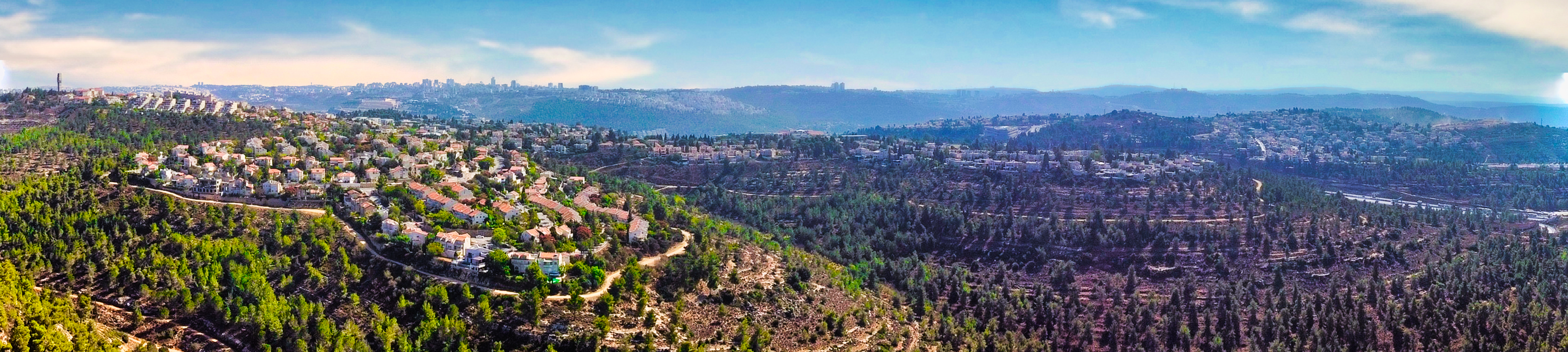
- Panorama of Mevaseret Zion

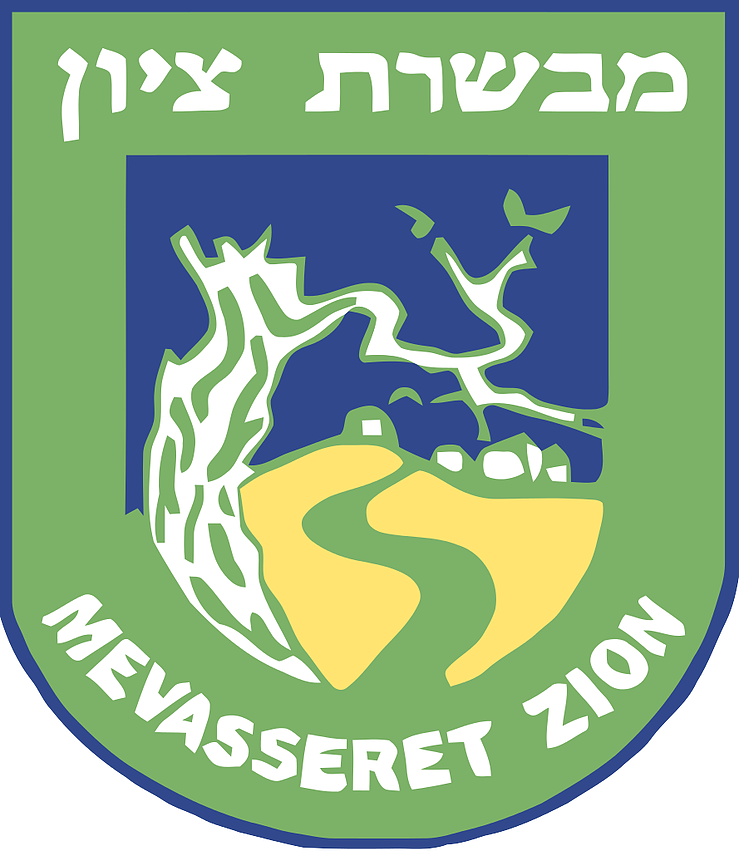
- Coat of arms

- Location within Jerusalem District Location within Israel
- Coordinates: 31°48′N 35°9′E
- Country: Israel
- District: Jerusalem
- Natural Region: Judean Mountains
- Founded: 1951

Government
  - Head of Municipality: Yoram Shimon

Area
  - Total: 6,390 dunams (6.39 km^{2}; 2.47 sq mi)

Population (2024)
  - Total: 26,534
  - Density: 4,150/km^{2} (10,800/sq mi)

Ethnicity
  - Jews and others: 99.6%
  - Arabs: 0.4%
- Name meaning: Herald of Zion (from Isaiah 40:9)

Mevaseret Zion (Hebrew: מבשרת ציון, lit. 'Herald of Zion') is a town and local council located 10 km (6 mi) to the west of Jerusalem, straddling both sides of the Jerusalem–Tel Aviv highway. Mevaseret Zion is composed of two distinct older townships, Maoz Zion and Mevaseret Yerushalayim, under the jurisdiction of one local council. The newer neighborhoods of Mevaseret Zion were not part of either township.

Mevaseret Zion is located on a mountain ridge 750 m (2,460 ft) above sea level, on the outskirts of Jerusalem. In 2024 it had a population of 24,409, spread over 15 neighborhoods. It is the wealthiest municipality per capita in the Jerusalem District. Mevaseret Zion's current mayor is Yoram Shimon.

== History ==
=== Castel area ===
Due to its strategic location, settlement in the area of Mevasseret Zion goes back to antiquity. The Romans built a fortress there, known as Castellum. On the ruins of this fortress, the Crusaders built a castle, Castellum Belveer, of which no trace remains. Belveer is mentioned in a letter from Eraclius, Patriarch of Jerusalem, dated September 1187, in which he describes the slaughter of Christians "by the sword of Mafumetus the Unbeliever and his evil worshipper Saladin" and the Arab conquest of the town, which was renamed al-Qastal.

During the British Mandate of Palestine, the British referred to this district as "The Castle". The Palestinian Arabs called it "al-Qastal", pronouncing the "t." The Jews called it "HaCástel" ("the Cástel").

In the 1948 Palestine war, battles took place here as Arabs and Jews fought for control of HaCástel, which overlooked the main Tel Aviv-Jerusalem highway. HaCástel exchanged hands several times in the course of the fighting. The tides turned when the Arab commander Abd al-Qadir al-Husayni was killed. Many of the Arabs left their positions to attend al-Husayni's funeral at the Al-Aqsa Mosque on Friday, April 9. That same day, HaCástel fell to the Yishuv forces, virtually unopposed.

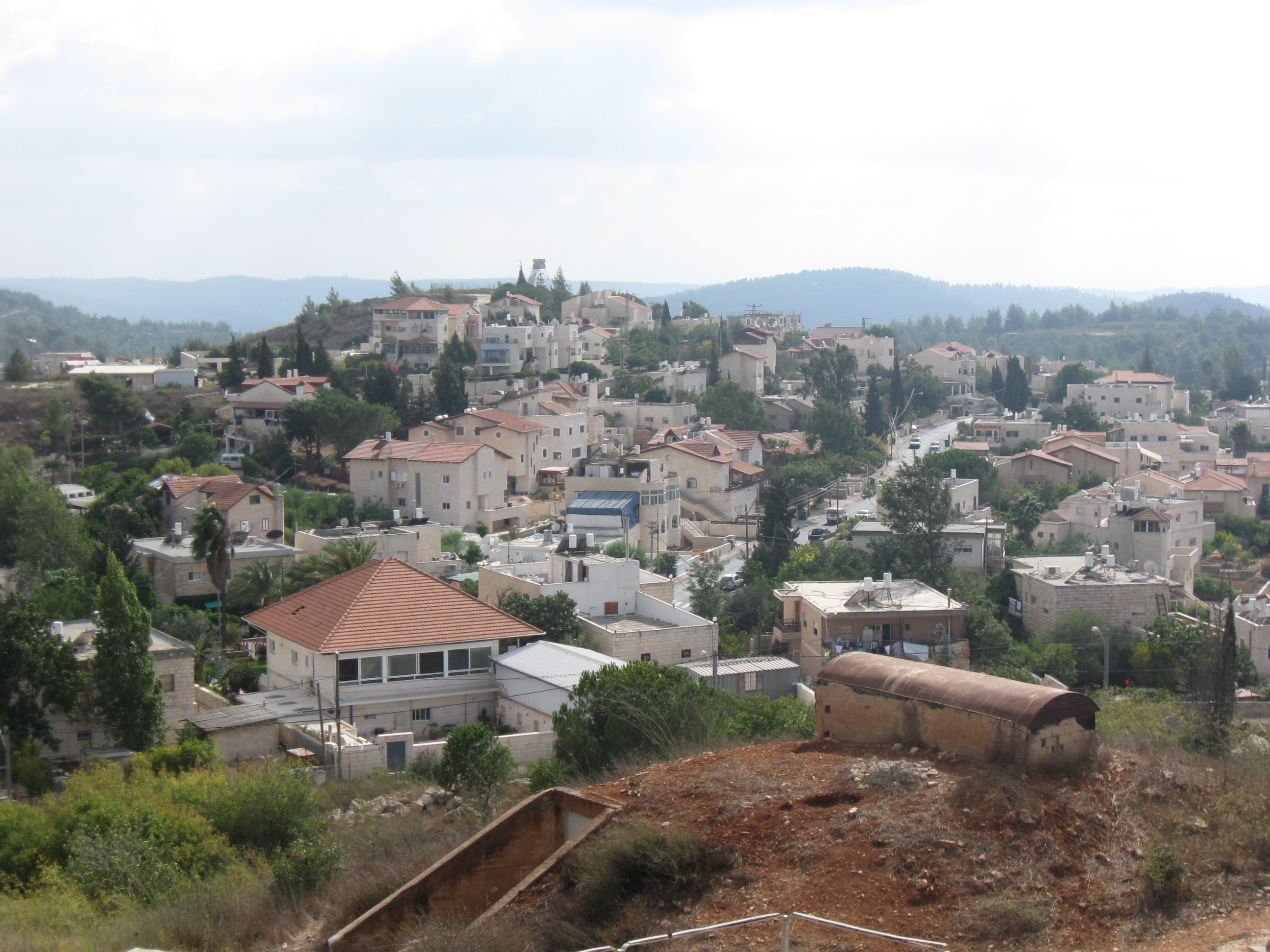
View of Maoz Zion from Castel National Park

=== Maoz Zion ===
Maoz Zion ("Stronghold of Zion") was established in 1951 to house new immigrants from Iraq, Kurdistan, North Africa and Iran who had been living in a ma'abara, or transit camp, at the foot of the Castel hill. Many were employed at the nearby Solel Boneh stone quarry.

=== Mevasseret Yerushalayim ===
Mevasseret Yerushalayim was established east of Ma'oz Zion in 1956 by Jewish immigrants from North Africa. It was located on a ridge near the armistice line, north of Motza. The residents worked in the fruit orchards in the Arazim Valley.

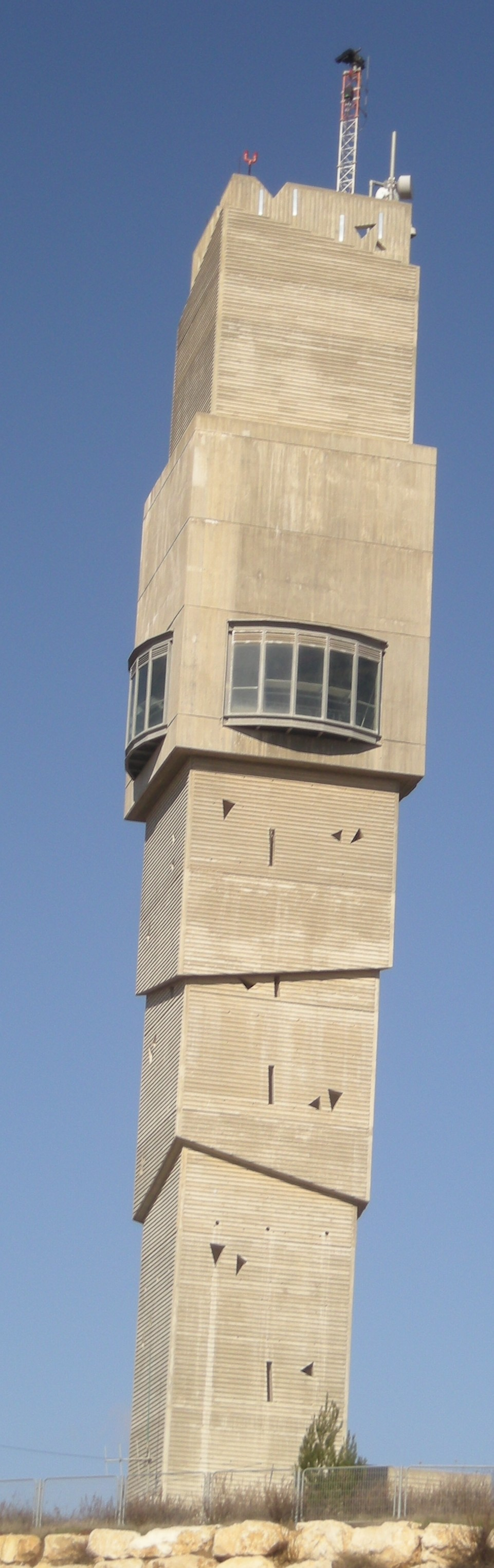
Mevasseret Zion water tower

=== Unified local council ===
In 1963, Maoz Zion and Mevasseret Yerushalayim formed a joint local council, which was called Mevasseret Zion. The source of the name is the Book of Isaiah: "על הר גבוה עלי לך מבשרת ציון" – "Ascend a lofty mountain, O herald of joy to Zion" (Isaiah 40:9).

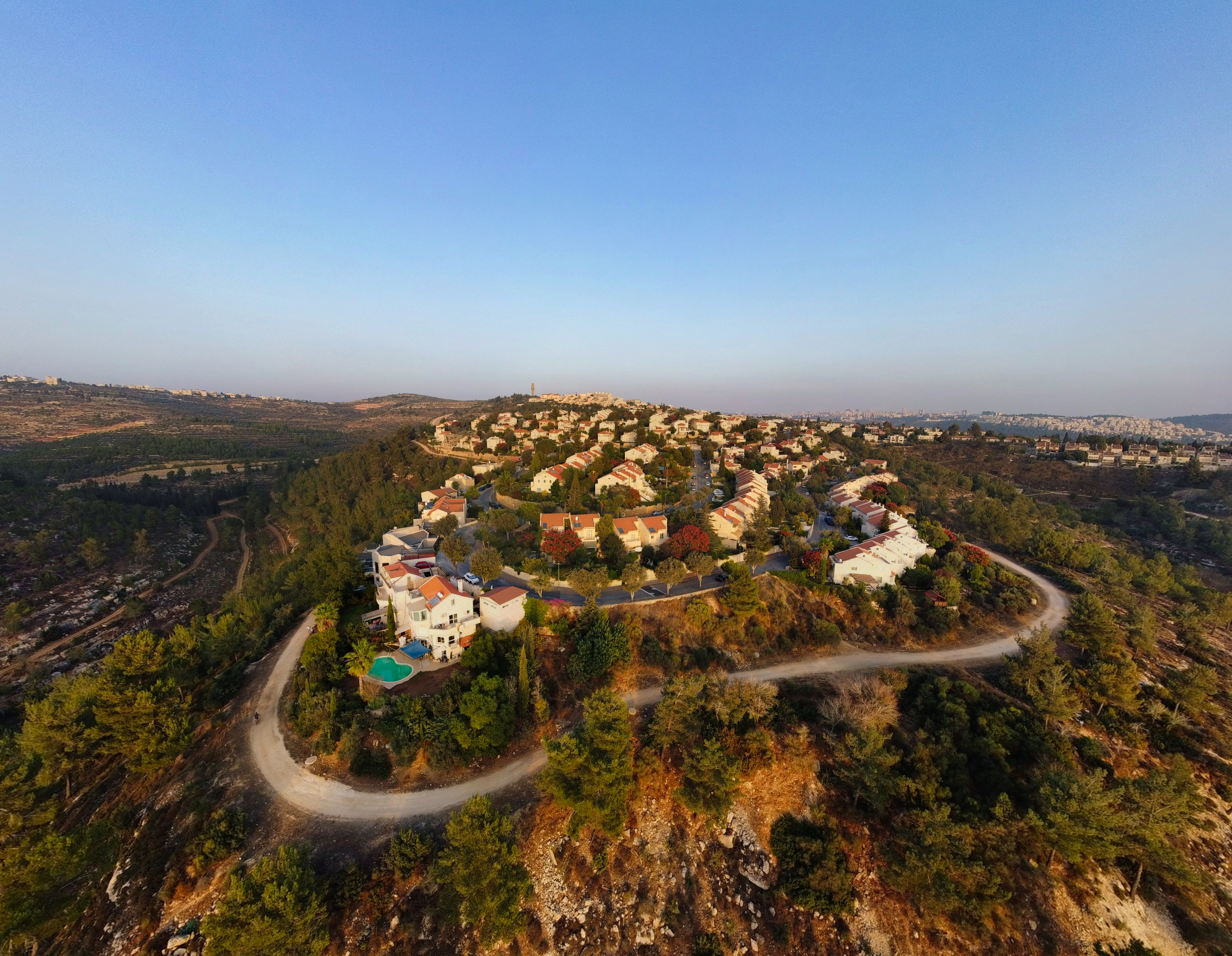
Mevasseret Zion "Snunit" neighborhood

== Institutions and landmarks ==
The Har'el shopping mall is located at the entrance to Mevasseret Zion, near the Har'el interchange. The mall serves the residents of Mevasseret Zion, Maoz Zion, the surrounding communities, as well as travelers on Route 1. The shopping mall which includes some 80 businesses has been joined by the Jerusalem Mall on the other side of the highway at the entrance of Maoz Zion.The world's first kosher McDonald's opened there in 1995. In addition to numerous Orthodox congregations, Mevasseret Zion also has a Reform congregation, Kehillat Mevasseret Zion, founded in 1993.

== Population ==
Historical population
Year	Pop.	±%
1972	4,500	—
1983	8,300	+84.4%
1995	16,100	+94.0%
2008	23,800	+47.8%
2022	25,476	+7.0%
2024	26,534	+4.2%

According to Israel Central Bureau of Statistics, as of November 2023 (estimated), 25,789 residents live in Mevaseret Zion (86th place in the ranking of local authorities in Israel). The population is growing at an annual growth rate of 2.2%.

== Education ==
Mevasseret Zion has 3 secular primary schools, 2 religious primary schools, 1 middle school, and 1 high school.

- Secular primary schools: "HaShalom" School, "Hador Tal'i" School, "Moledet" School.
- Religious primary schools: "Hemdat Ha-shaked" and "Tzlili Noam"
- Middle school: "Hayovel Middle School"
- High school: "Tichon Har'el"
- Yeshiva: "Yeshivat Sha'arei Mevasseret" includes a kollel, mostly catering to adult Israeli men, and a gap year program for students from English-speaking high schools.

== Archaeology ==
In April–May 2003, an archaeological salvage dig carried out on Nahal Sorek Street in Mevasseret Zion unearthed an ancient burial cave dating from the mid-Second Temple period.

The ruins of a medieval structure, Khirbet Beit Mizza, are located in Mevasseret Zion, and were believed by some scholars to be the site of the biblical town of Mozah mentioned in the Book of Joshua (Joshua 18:26), until recent excavations made clear that Mozah of the Hebrew Bible is to be identified with nearby Khirbet Mizzah, the Arabic name by which the ruins of the Arab village of Qalunya are known, which were hence named in Modern Hebrew as Tel Moza.

== Sports ==
Mevasseret Zion holds both a soccer team and a basketball team, both playing for low leagues.

Hapoel Mevaseret Zion plays in Israel's Liga Gimel, Israel's 5th league. It started as Hapoel Mevasseret Zion and then united with Ironi Abu Ghosh, and became the first Israeli team mixed from an Arab village and a Jewish town. In 2007 Mevasseret-Abu Ghosh was united with Hapoel Katamon, and then separated again. The team is built of Arab and Jewish players, and participated in international friendly tournaments for peace. The team plays in local soccer field called "Hamigrash Hayarok", which means in Hebrew, the green field. The capacity is about 200 people.

Hapoel Mevaseret Zion also plays for Liga Bet. The team plays in the local basketball court with a capacity of 300 seats.

== Voting patterns ==
In the 2022 election, 50 percent of voters in Mevaseret Zion voted for the parties of the right-wing coalition led by Benjamin Netanyahu, while 48 percent voted for the parties of the center-left coalition led by Yair Lapid and 0.4 percent voted for the Arab parties.

In the 2026 election, 46.7 percent of voters in Mevaseret Zion voted for the parties of the center-left coalition led by Gadi Eisenkot, while 46.5 percent voted for the parties of the right-wing coalition led by Benjamin Netanyahu and 0.4 percent voted for the Arab parties. An additional 3.6 percent voted for the Reservists, and 2.4 percent voted for Amcha Yisrael. Voter turnout increased 16 percent from the 2022 election.

== Notable residents ==
- Rachel Adato (born 1947), gynaecologist, lawyer and politician
- Dan Bahat (born 1938), archaeologist
- Aharon Appelfeld (1932–2018), novelist and Holocaust survivor
- Itamar Ben-Gvir, (born 1976), politician
- Shlomo Bentin (1946–2012), neuropsychologist
- Charlie Biton (1947–2024), social activist and former politician
- Ran Cohen (born 1937), politician
- Martin van Creveld (born 1946), military historian and theorist
- David Grossman (born 1954), author
- Tzachi Hanegbi (born 1957), politician and national security expert
- Mickey Levy (born 1951), policeman and politician
- Josh Reinstein
- Amnon Shashua (born 1960), computer scientist and businessman
- Yuval Steinitz (born 1958), politician
- Matan Vilnai (born 1944), military and politician
- Meirav Cohen (born 1983) politician and social equality activist
- Carmi Gillon (born 1950), former head of Shin Bet, head of the Mevasseret Zion local council (2003-2007)
- Alon Liel (born 1948), international relations scholar and former diplomat
- Daphna Liel (born 1983), journalist and reporter for Channel 12
- David Witzthum (born 1948), television presenter, editor and lecturer on German history and culture
- Emi Palmor (born 1966), lawyer and senior civil servant

== Sister cities ==
- (United States) White Plains, New York (2004)
- Sankt Augustin, Germany (2001)
- (United States) Calabasas, California (2012)

== See also ==
- 1947–48 Civil War in Mandatory Palestine
