= Castel National Park =

Israeli national park

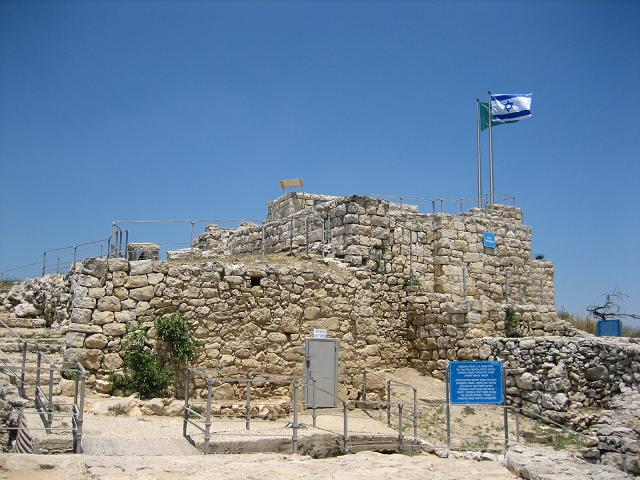
- The Castel fortress
- Interactive map of Castel National Park
- Coordinates: 31°47′44.38″N 35°8′39.09″E

Castel National Park (Hebrew: גן לאומי קסטל) is an Israeli national park, which consists of a fortified summit in the Judean Mountains, at the site of the former Palestinian village of Al-Qastal, known to Hebrew-speakers as HaCástel, "the Cástel". It is located 8 km west of Jerusalem on the road linking it to Tel Aviv (Highway 1).

The site is mostly known as the place of the key battles of Operation Nachshon, which were fought there in April 1948 during the 1948 Arab–Israeli War. Fierce battles that claimed many lives took place there as Arabs and Jews fought for control of the site, which overlooked the main Tel Aviv-Jerusalem highway. Castel exchanged hands several times in the course of the fighting. The tides turned when the revered Arab commander, Abd al-Qadir al-Husayni, was killed. Many of the Arabs left their positions to attend al-Husayni's funeral at the Al-Aqsa Mosque on Friday, April 9. That same day, Castel fell to the Israeli forces virtually unopposed.

The national park includes a memorial for the Israeli soldiers who died there, including a monument designed in 1980 by Yitzhak Yamin and a memorial to the convoys that tried to break through the blockade of Jerusalem.

== History ==
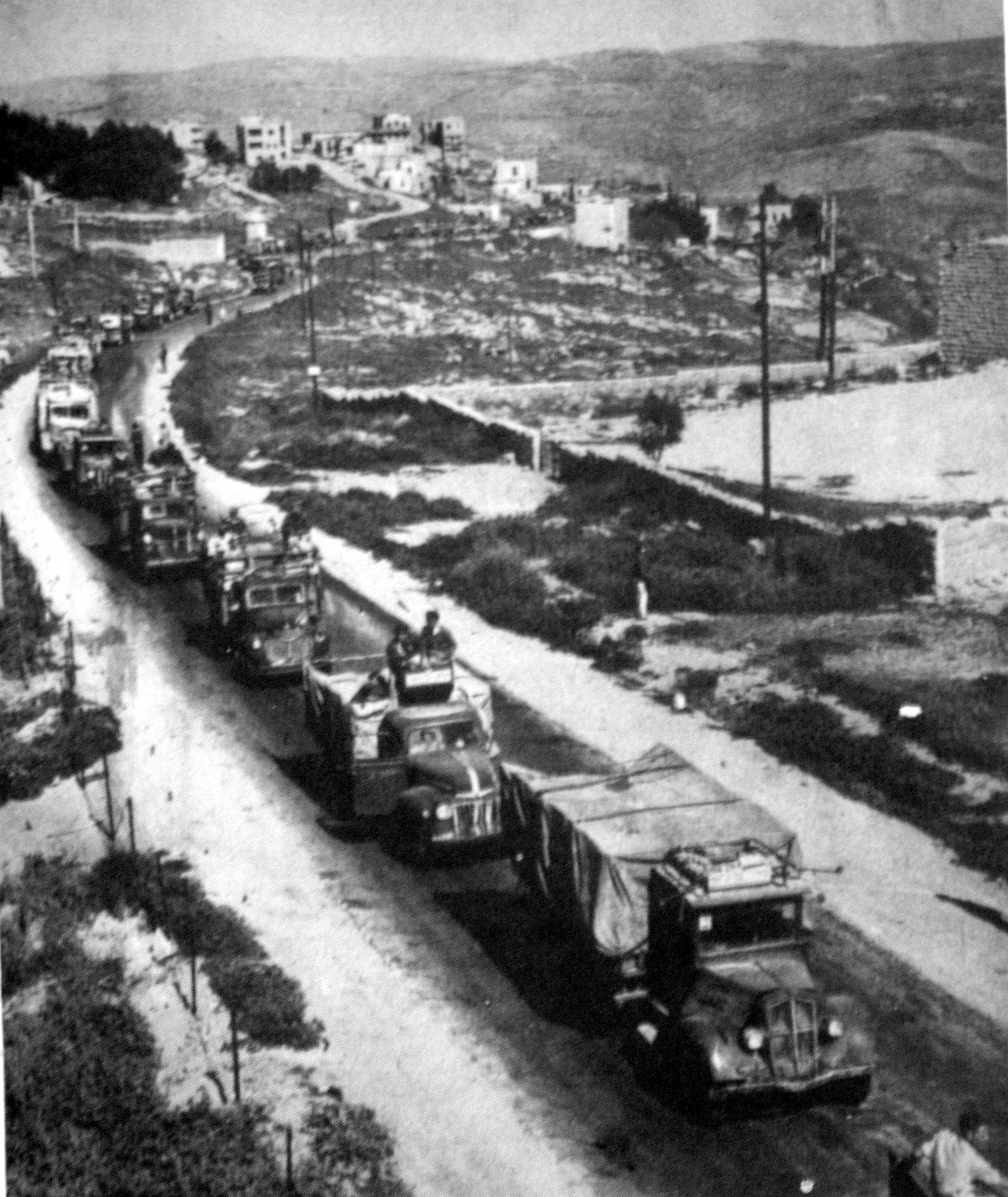
Convoy on its way to Jerusalem, 1948

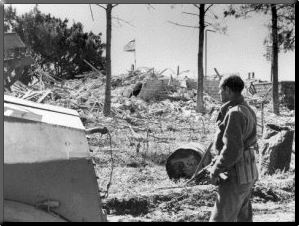
Qastal during Operation Nahshon

=== Roman period ===
Due to its strategic location, settlement in the area go back to antiquity. The Romans built a fortress there, known simply as Castellum to ensure their control of the road to Jerusalem.

=== Crusader period ===
The Crusaders built over the ruins of the Roman fortress a castle mentioned in chronicles as Castellum Belveer, of which no traces have been found.

=== Ottoman period ===
After the fall of the Crusaders, Castel disappeared from historical sources for centuries. Eventually, an Arab village grew up around this spot. The mukhtar's house was built on the hilltop, on the ruins of the Crusader castle.

=== British Mandate ===
During the British Mandate of Palestine, the British referred to this district as "The Castle".

=== 1947-1948 war ===
In 1947, the Arab siege on Jerusalem led to severe water and food rationing. With the population on the verge of starvation, supply vehicles began travelling the road in convoys accompanied by guards. Buses and trucks were covered with steel plates surrounding a wooden board which made them heavy and cumbersome. Their slow ascent to Jerusalem made them a perfect target. When the Arabs of al-Qastal saw a convoy approaching they would place a boulder across the narrow road and hide among the trees. When the driver stopped to clear the road, they lobbed explosives and massacred everyone in sight.

By April 1, 1948, when Jerusalem had run out of water and the population was reduced to eating plants, the Palmach launched Operation Nachshon. The commandos found the village nearly empty and met with little resistance. When word of the Castel's fall reached Arab leaders, they ordered revered commander Abd al-Qadir al-Husayni to take it back. Thousands answered his call to arms. Equipped with knives, clubs, rifles, guns and explosives, they ascended the hill in waves, and attacked for five days. The Jewish defenders ran out of food and ammunition, and reinforcements failed to arrive.

On April 8, two guards spotted three unidentified figures walking up the slopes and opened fire on them. Two fled, but one of them, who turned out to be al-Huysani, was killed. An hour later, a soldier listening to Arabic radio broadcasts heard a phrase repeated over and over: "The bird fell in the cage." The "bird" was a code word for al-Huysani. Masses of Arabs rushed to the slopes of the Castel and opened fire on three fronts. Many of the Jewish fighters were killed, and the Castel was recaptured. The next day, Palmah commandos returned at dawn and found only a few people left on the hill. The Arabs had recovered al-Huysani's body and gone to bury him.

== Memorial ==
The Jewish village of Maoz Zion ("Stronghold of Zion") was established there in 1951 at the foot of Castel Hill. Today the entire hill with the fortress ruins and trenches is a memorial site. The site contains many bronze plaques which describe the course of the fighting in April 1948.

== See also ==
- National parks and nature reserves of Israel
