= Ganot =

Moshav in central Israel

Ganot: גנות (Hebrew)
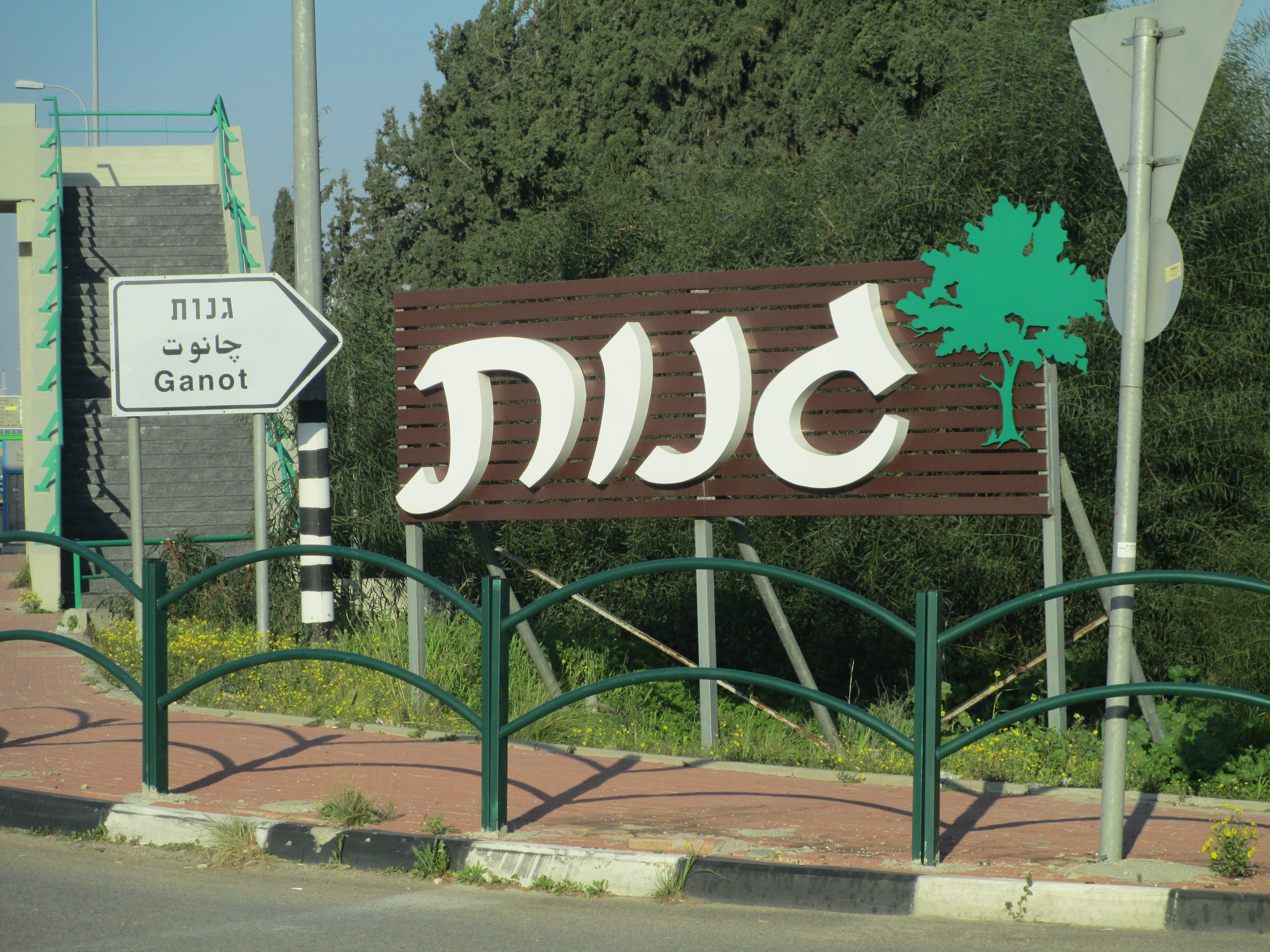

- Location within Central Israel
- Coordinates: 32°0′59″N 34°49′58″E
- Country: Israel
- District: Central
- Subdistrict: Ramla
- Council: Sdot Dan
- Affiliation: Agricultural Union
- Founded: 1950
- Founder: Demobilised IDF soldiers
- Population (2024): 476

Ganot (Hebrew: גנות, lit. 'Gardens') is a moshav in the Central District of Israel. Located near Hiriya (now Ariel Sharon Park), it falls under the jurisdiction of Sdot Dan Regional Council. In 2024 it had a population of 476.

== History ==
During the 18th and 19th centuries, the area of Ganot belonged to the Nahiyeh (sub-district) of Lod that encompassed the area of the present-day city of Modi'in-Maccabim-Re'ut in the south to the present-day city of El'ad in the north, and from the foothills in the east, through the Lod Valley to the outskirts of Jaffa in the west. This area was home to thousands of inhabitants in about 20 villages, who had at their disposal tens of thousands of hectares of prime agricultural land.

The village was first established in 1950 by demobilised soldiers, but was later abandoned. It was re-established in 1955 by Rassco (the Rural and Suburban Settlement Company) and took in residents from all over the country. Its name is taken from the Book of Amos 9:14;

And I will turn the captivity of My people Israel, and they shall build the waste cities, and inhabit them; and they shall plant vineyards, and drink the wine thereof; they shall also make gardens, and eat the fruit of them.

The Ganot interchange, a junction between Highway 1 and Highway 4, is located next to the moshav.
