= Shlomo Bentin =

Israeli neuropsychologist (1946–2012)

Shlomo Bentin שלמה בנטין
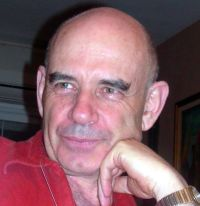
- Shlomo Bentin, 2006
- Born: August 26, 1946; Bucharest, Romania
- Died: July 13, 2012 (aged 65); Berkeley, California, US
- Resting place: Menucha Nechona, Kfar Saba, Israel
- Spouse: Miri Bentin
- Awards: Israel Prize
- Scientific career
- Fields: neuropsychology

Shlomo Bentin (Hebrew: שלמה בנטין; August 26, 1946 – July 13, 2012) was an Israeli neuropsychologist and recipient of the 2012 Israel Prize in psychology. Bentin was a professor of psychology and education, and a member of the Center for Neural Computation at the Hebrew University of Jerusalem.

== Biography ==
Bentin was born in Bucharest, Romania in 1946. In 1958 Bentin immigrated to Israel and grew up in Kibbutz Gan Shmuel and later on attended the military command boarding school near the Hebrew Reali School in Haifa where he graduated in 1965. Later on Bentin served his mandatory military service in the Israeli Defense Forces in the Paratroopers Brigade. After his mandatory military service Bentin continued to serve in the IDF as a permanent service, moved to the armored corps and established the reconnaissance company of the 14th Brigade.

In 1974 Bentin received his BA in psychology from Tel Aviv University. Between 1974 until 1976 Bentin studied for a master's degree at the Medical School of the Technion, and in 1977 Bentin received a degree in medicine.

In 1976 Bentin moved to Jerusalem and was appointed to the position of director of the human psychophysiology lab at the Hadassah Medical Center's neurology department. In 1982 Bentin received a Ph.D. in neuropsychology at the Medical School of the Hebrew University of Jerusalem. Later on Bentin studied at the Yale University in New Haven, Connecticut. During that time he also worked there at the Neuropsychology Laboratory of the University's School of Medicine and at the Haskins Laboratories, where he continued to be a member of the research staff until 2005.

In 1984 in Bentin returned to the Hadassah Medical Center and founded the diagnostic-clinical neuropsychology service at the hospital. During this time Bentin developed a method for monitoring nerve conduction abnormalities along the spinal cord during scoliosis surgeries. This method was based on nerve stimulation of the feet and on the measuring of the response in the neck - which made it unnecessary for the surgeons to wake up the patients during the surgery in order to check the patients' ability to move their legs, in cases of concerns for nerve injury during spine alignment procedures.

In 1983 Bentin was appointed as a lecturer of psychology at the Hebrew University Medical School and in 1987 he was appointed senior lecturer. In 1991 Bentin was promoted to associate professor and in 1994 to professor. Bentin served as the head of the special education department until 1994, and was the founder of the Hebrew University's Center for Neural Computation. Between the years 1994 - 1998 Bentin headed the Neuropsychology department of the Hebrew University.

In 1991 Bentin initiated the cognitive electrophysiology laboratory at the Hebrew University. The lab's primary mission is to promote research in cognitive neuroscience and cognitive neuropsychology, with a particular emphasis on face perception, attention, and dynamic processes in episodic and semantic memory. Recent studies have also focused on finding EEG correlates to the mirror neuron system.

Bentin was the recipient of the 2012 Israel Prize in the field of psychology.

On July 13, 2012, Bentin was killed in a collision with a dump truck while riding a bicycle near the University of California, Berkeley.

Bentin was married and had three children. He lived in Mevasseret Zion.

== Education ==
- Bachelor of Arts, (Psychology), Tel Aviv University 1974
- Master of Sciences (Medical Sciences) Technion, Haifa, 1977
- Doctor of Philosophy (Neuropsychology), Hebrew University of Jerusalem, 1982

== Academic nominations ==
- Professor of Psychology and Education, 1994
- Associate Professor of Psychology and Education, 1991
- Senior Lecturer of Psychology, 1987
- Lecturer of Psychology, 1983
- Instructor of Psychology, 1980

== Clinical experience ==
- Director of the Neuropsychological Assessment Service, Department of Neurology, Hadassah Hospital, Jerusalem, Israel 1976-1990
- Director of the Evoked Potentials Assessment Service (VEP, BERA, SER), Department of Neurology, Hadassah Hospital, Jerusalem, Israel 1984-1990
- Intra-operative monitoring of CNS electrophysiological activity 1986-1989

== Administrative experience ==
- Head of the Neuropsychology Division -Department of Psychology 1994-1998
- Head of the Research Students Committee -Social Sciences Subdivision 1993-1996
