= Al-Qastal, Jerusalem =

al-Qastal القسطل
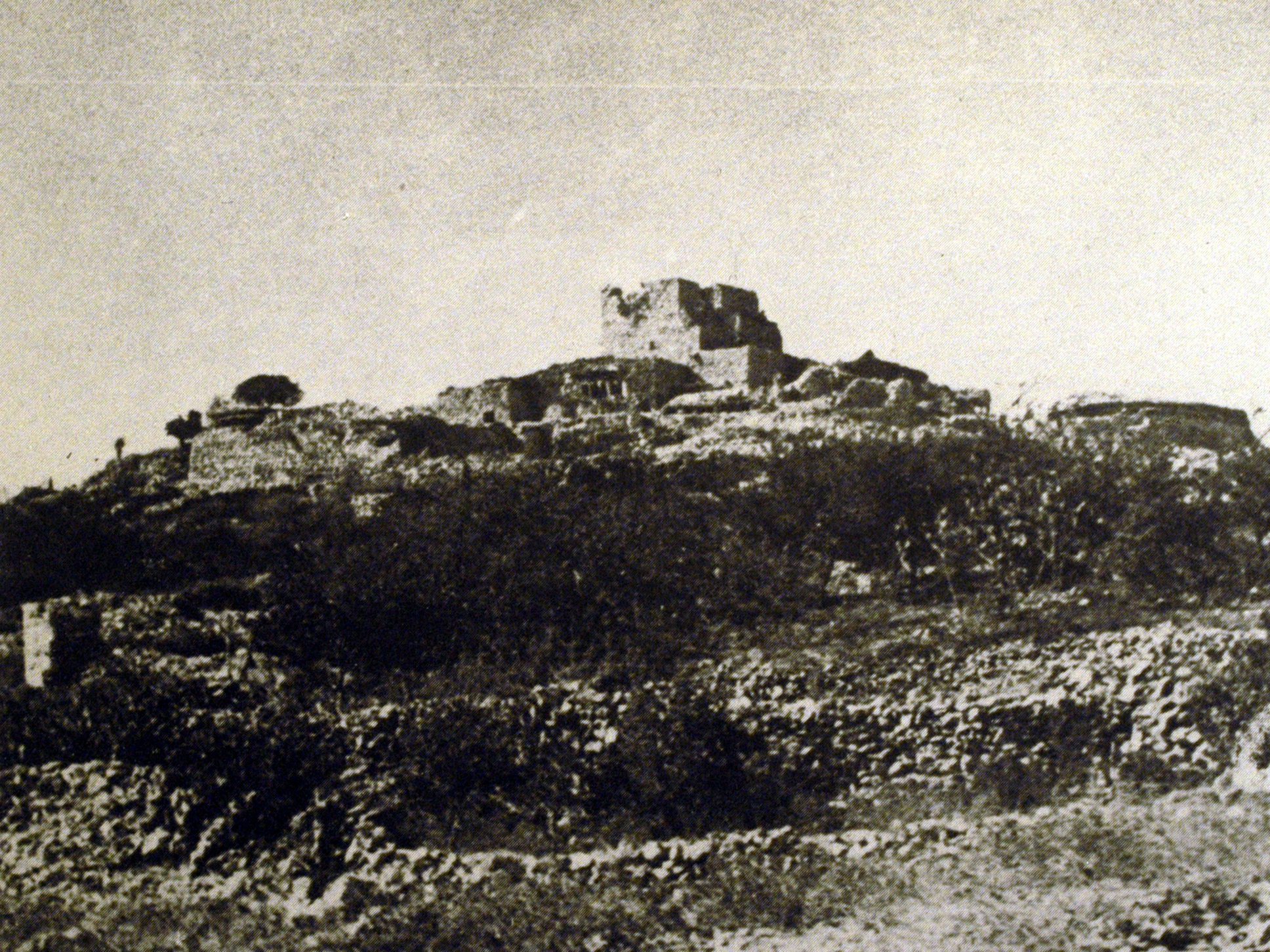
- al-Qastal hill
- Etymology: "castellum" or castale
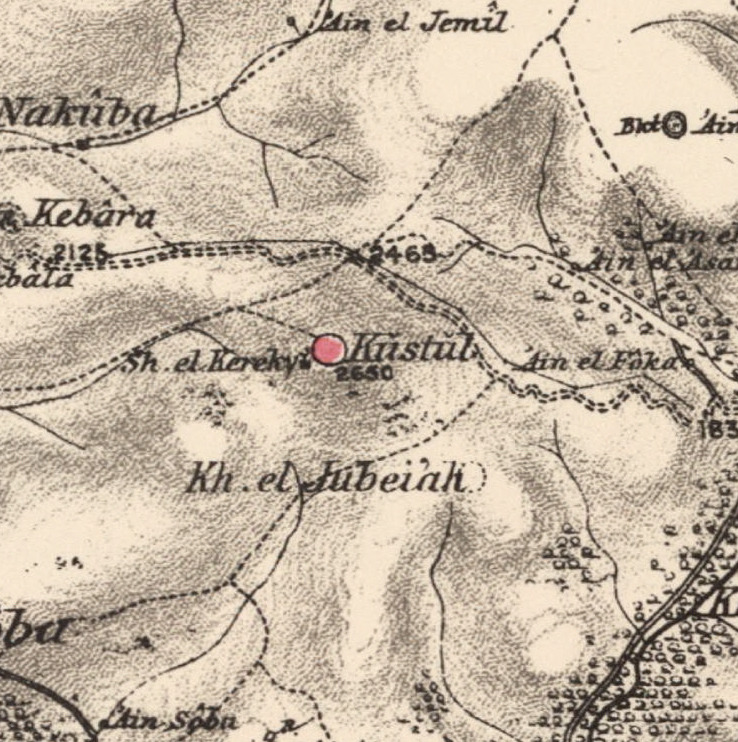
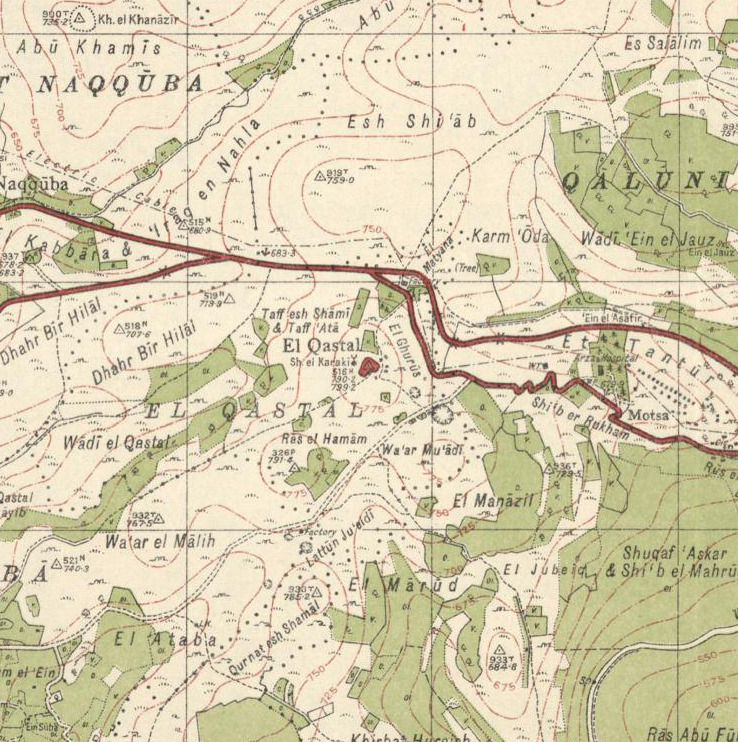
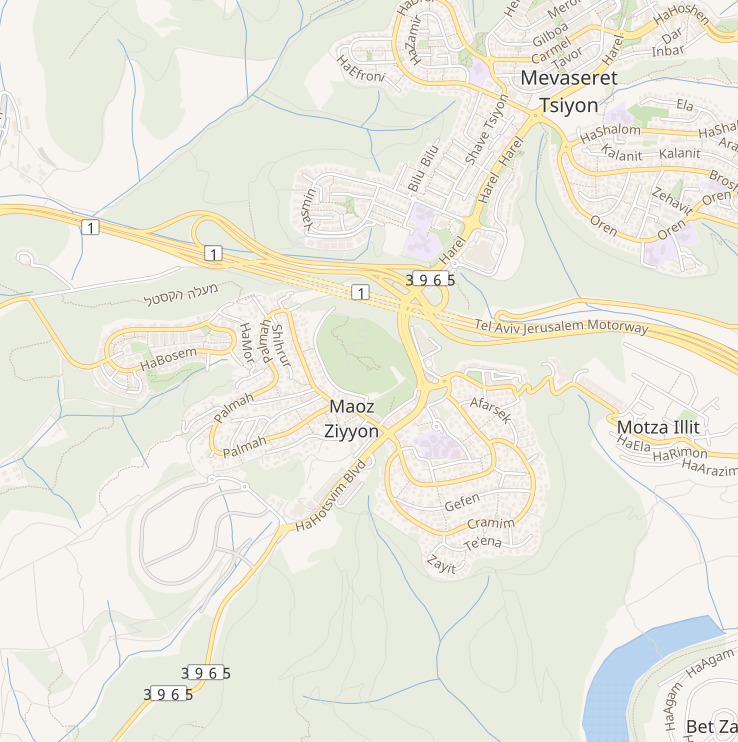
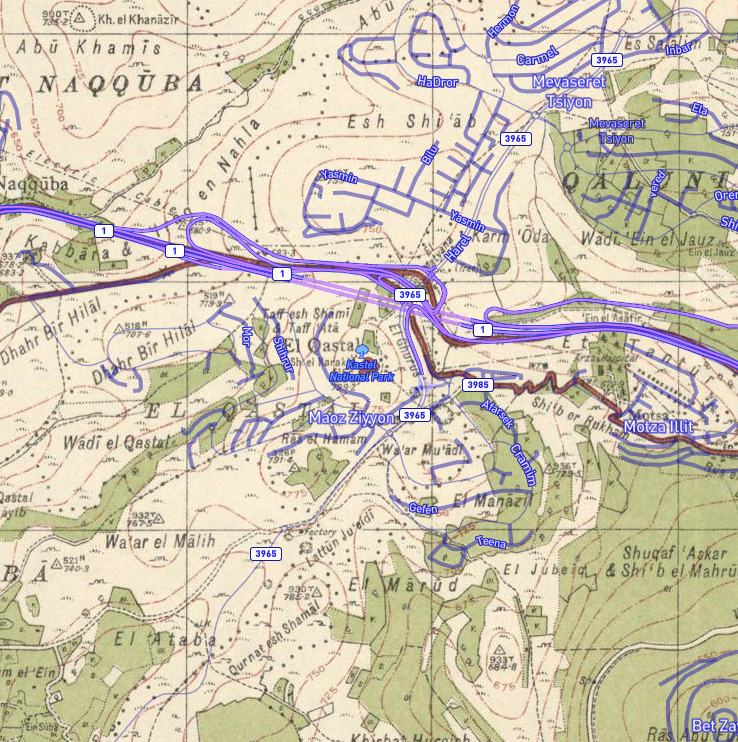
- 1870s map 1940s map modern map 1940s with modern overlay map A series of historical maps of the area around Al-Qastal, Jerusalem (click the buttons)

- Location within Mandatory Palestine
- Coordinates: 31°47′44″N 35°8′39″E
- Palestine grid: 163/133
- Geopolitical entity: Mandatory Palestine
- Subdistrict: Jerusalem
- Date of depopulation: 3 April 1948

Area
  - Total: 1.4 km^{2} (0.54 sq mi)

Population (1945)
  - Total: 90
- Cause(s) of depopulation: Ethnic cleansing by Yishuv forces
- Current Localities: Mevaseret Zion Castel National Park

Al-Qastal ("Kastel", Arabic: القسطل) was a Palestinian village located eight kilometers west of Jerusalem and named for a Crusader castle once standing on the hilltop. Used during the 1948 Arab–Israeli War as a military base by the Army of the Holy War, virtually all of its residents fled during the fighting and the village was eventually captured by the Palmach. It is currently the site of the Israeli Castel National Park, which commemorates the 1948 battles fought for the control of this strategic height.

== History ==
=== Crusader period ===
A Crusader castle called Belveer or Beauverium (in Latin Videbelum) was built there around 1168 CE. It is listed among the castles destroyed by Sultan al-Adil I in 1191–92 CE. No trace remains today of the castle.

Belveer is mentioned in a letter from Eraclius, Latin Patriarch of Jerusalem, written in the aftermath of the catastrophic Crusader defeat at the Battle of Hattin and dated September 1187, in which he describes the capture by the Muslims of a long list of towns of the Kingdom of Jerusalem, and the slaughter of Christians "by the sword of Mafumetus the Unbeliever and his evil worshipper Saladin".

=== Ottoman period ===
In 1838 el-Kustul was noted as a Muslim village, part of Beni Malik area, located west of Jerusalem.

In 1863, Victor Guérin found modern buildings on ancient ruins. He noted that the village belonged to the Abu Ghosh clan. An Ottoman village list from about 1870 found that Kastal had a population of 10, in 5 houses; the population count included only men.

In 1883, in the PEF's Survey of Western Palestine, al-Qastal was described as "a small stone village in a conspicuous position on a rocky hill-top" with springs to the east.

In 1896 the population of El-kastal was estimated to be about 39 persons.

=== British Mandate period ===
In the 1922 census of Palestine conducted by the British Mandate authorities, Qastal had a population 43, all Muslims, increasing in the 1931 census to 59; 55 Muslims and 4 Christians, in a total of 14 houses.

In the 1945 statistics, the village, with a population of 90 Muslims, had a total of 42 dunums of land allocated to cereals. 169 dunums were irrigated or used for orchards, including 50 dunams of olive trees.

=== 1948 war ===
In 1948, al-Qastal was a key position on the Jaffa-Jerusalem road and was used by Arab forces to attack Jewish relief convoys so as to prevent them from reaching the besieged Jewish parts of Jerusalem. For this purpose, it was occupied by the Army of the Holy War led by Abd al-Qadir al-Husayni, the commander of the Jerusalem Hills sector.

The village was assaulted by the Palmach's Harel Brigade and two squads of the Haganah during Operation Nachshon, after a previous minor clash had already caused most civilian inhabitants to flee. Palmach troops occupied the village on April 3, but its commander was refused permission to blow up the houses.

Forces under Abd al-Qadir al-Husayni attacked and besieged the Haganah-held village on 7 April 1948. During the following, foggy night al-Husayni himself was killed by a Haganah sentinel. On April 8, motivated by the death of their popular commander, a great number of armed Arabs from the entire area attacked and recaptured al-Qastal during the afternoon, recovering al-Husayni's body in the process. However, al-Husayni's death is said to have led to a loss of morale among his forces. Most fighters left their positions to attend al-Husayni's funeral at the Al-Aqsa Mosque compound on Friday, April 9. Palmach troops retook the almost fully deserted village on the night of April 8-9th; they blew up most of the houses and made the hill a command post, which they managed to hold on to.

==== Gallery ====
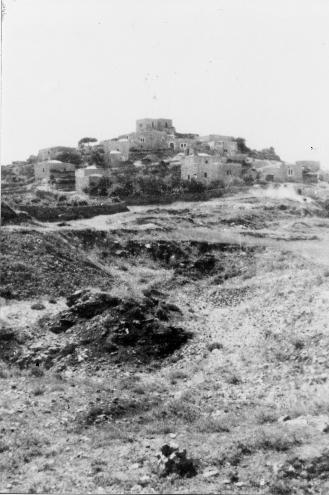
View of Qastal in 1948 before Operation Nachshon

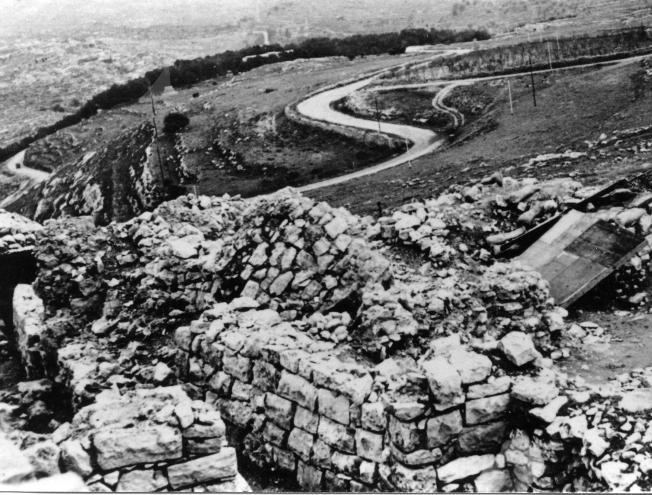
View of the road from Qastal

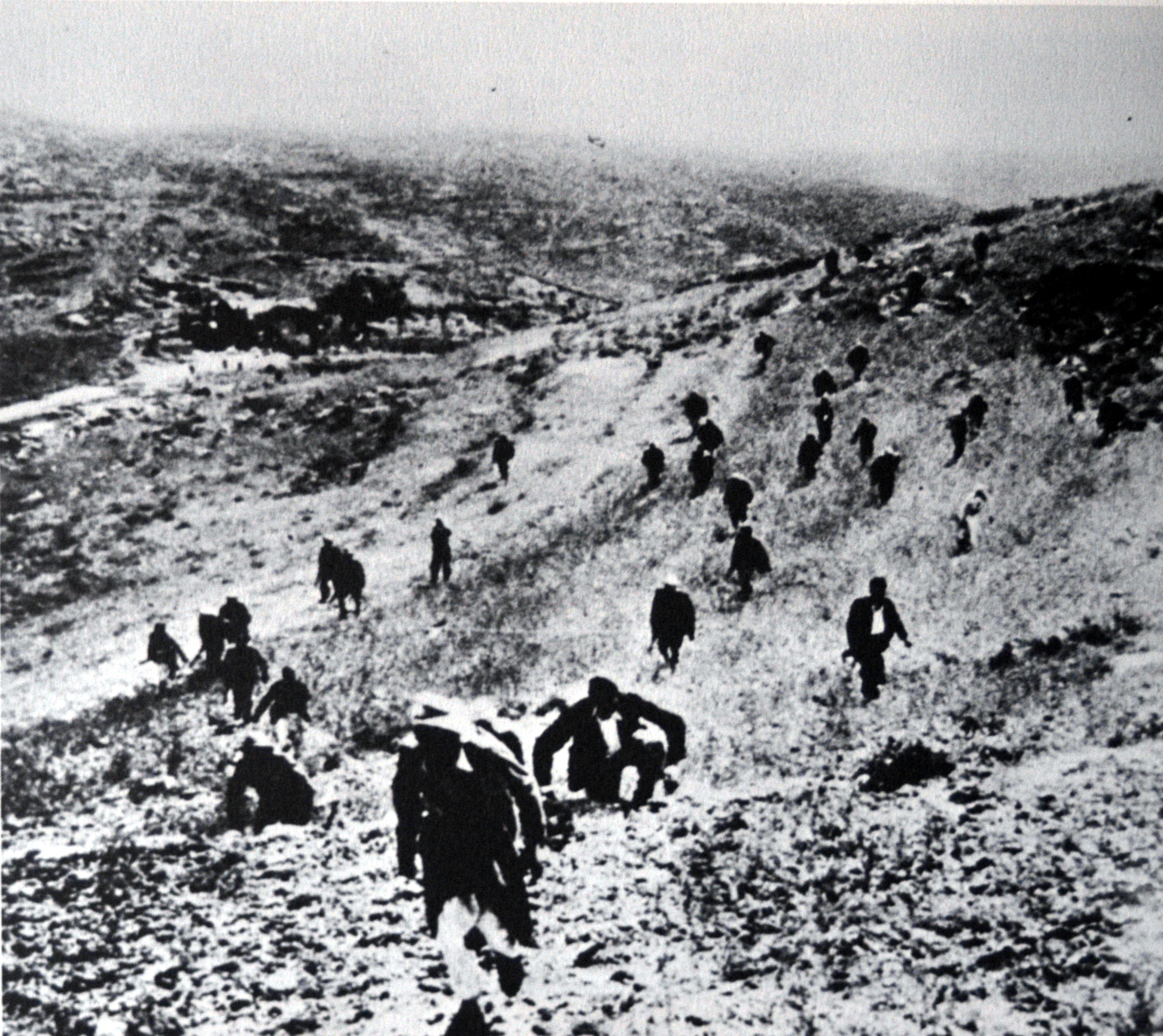
Palestinian irregulars moving to counterattack Haganah positions in Al-Qastal, 7–8 April 1948

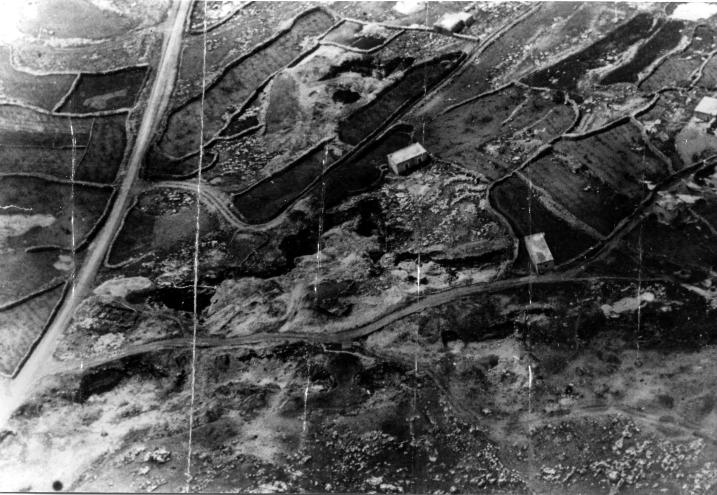
Approach to Qastal from the air, 1948

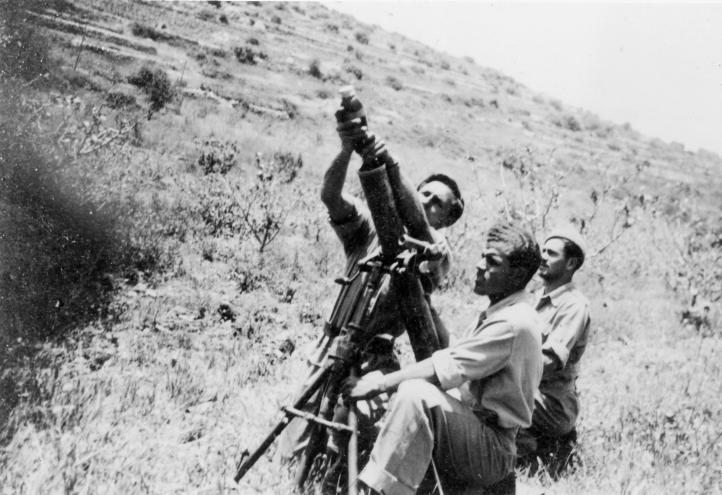
Harel Brigade mortar in action during battle for Qastal

=== Israel ===
Parts of the Israeli town of Mevaseret Zion are located on the former lands of al-Qastal.

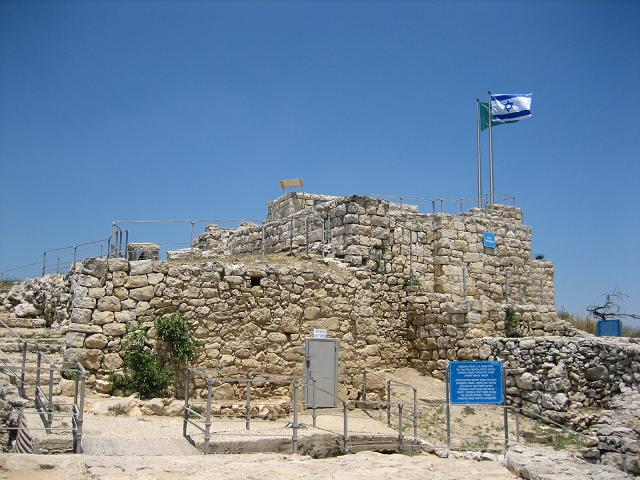
Castel, the "Mukhtar's House" lookout (2006)

The remains of the village at the hilltop has been fitted out by the Israel Nature and Parks Authority as Castel National Site, "a symbol of the struggle to break through to Jerusalem during the War of Independence", where one can visit the 1948 trenches and a monument to the fallen, see a movie, and descend along a scenic trail.

== See also ==
- Castel National Park
- Depopulated Palestinian locations in Israel
- List of villages depopulated during the Arab–Israeli conflict

== Bibliography ==
- Barber, M.; Bate, Keith (2010). Letters from the East: Crusaders, Pilgrims and Settlers in the 12th-13th Centuries. Crusade texts in translation. Vol. 18. Ashgate Publishing. p. 79. ISBN 9780754663560.
- Barron, J.B., ed. (1923). Palestine: Report and General Abstracts of the Census of 1922. Government of Palestine.
- Benvenisti, M. (2002). Sacred Landscape: The Buried History of the Holy Land Since 1948. University of California Press. ISBN 978-0-520-23422-2.
- Conder, C.R.; Kitchener, H.H. (1883). The Survey of Western Palestine: Memoirs of the Topography, Orography, Hydrography, and Archaeology. Vol. 3. London: Committee of the Palestine Exploration Fund.
- Guérin, V. (1868). Description Géographique Historique et Archéologique de la Palestine (in French). Vol. 1: Judée, pt. 1. Paris: L'Imprimerie Nationale.
- Hartmann, M. (1883). "Die Ortschaftenliste des Liwa Jerusalem in dem türkischen Staatskalender für Syrien auf das Jahr 1288 der Flucht (1871)". Zeitschrift des Deutschen Palästina-Vereins. 6: 102–149.
- Khalidi, W. (1992). All That Remains: The Palestinian Villages Occupied and Depopulated by Israel in 1948. Washington D.C.: Institute for Palestine Studies. ISBN 0-88728-224-5.
- Mills, E., ed. (1932). Census of Palestine 1931. Population of Villages, Towns and Administrative Areas. Jerusalem: Government of Palestine.
- Morris, B. (2004). The Birth of the Palestinian Refugee Problem Revisited. Cambridge University Press. ISBN 978-0-521-00967-6.
- Morris, B. (2008). 1948: A History of the First Arab-Israeli War. Yale University Press. ISBN 978-0-300-15112-1.
- Palmer, E.H. (1881). The Survey of Western Palestine: Arabic and English Name Lists Collected During the Survey by Lieutenants Conder and Kitchener, R. E. Transliterated and Explained by E.H. Palmer. Committee of the Palestine Exploration Fund.
- Pringle, D. (1997). Secular buildings in the Crusader Kingdom of Jerusalem: an archaeological gazetter. Cambridge University Press. ISBN 0521-46010-7.
- Robinson, E.; Smith, E. (1841). Biblical Researches in Palestine, Mount Sinai and Arabia Petraea: A Journal of Travels in the year 1838. Boston: Crocker & Brewster.
  - Volume 2
  - Volume 3
- Schick, C. (1896). "Zur Einwohnerzahl des Bezirks Jerusalem". Zeitschrift des Deutschen Palästina-Vereins. 19: 120–127.
- Socin, A. (1879). "Alphabetisches Verzeichniss von Ortschaften des Paschalik Jerusalem". Zeitschrift des Deutschen Palästina-Vereins. 2: 135–163.
- Village Statistics, April, 1945. Government of Palestine, Department of Statistics. 1945.
  - Copy at the National Library of Israel (from microfilm)
  - Reproduced in Hadawi, S. (1970). Village Statistics of 1945: A Classification of Land and Area ownership in Palestine. Palestine Liberation Organization Research Center. Archived from the original on 8 December 2018.
