= Highway 1 (Israel–Palestine) =

Highway in Israel

Coordinates: 31°48′38″N 35°02′45″E

Highway 1
- כביש 1
- Tel Aviv – Jerusalem Highway; כביש תל אביב – ירושלים; Jericho Road; דרך יריחו
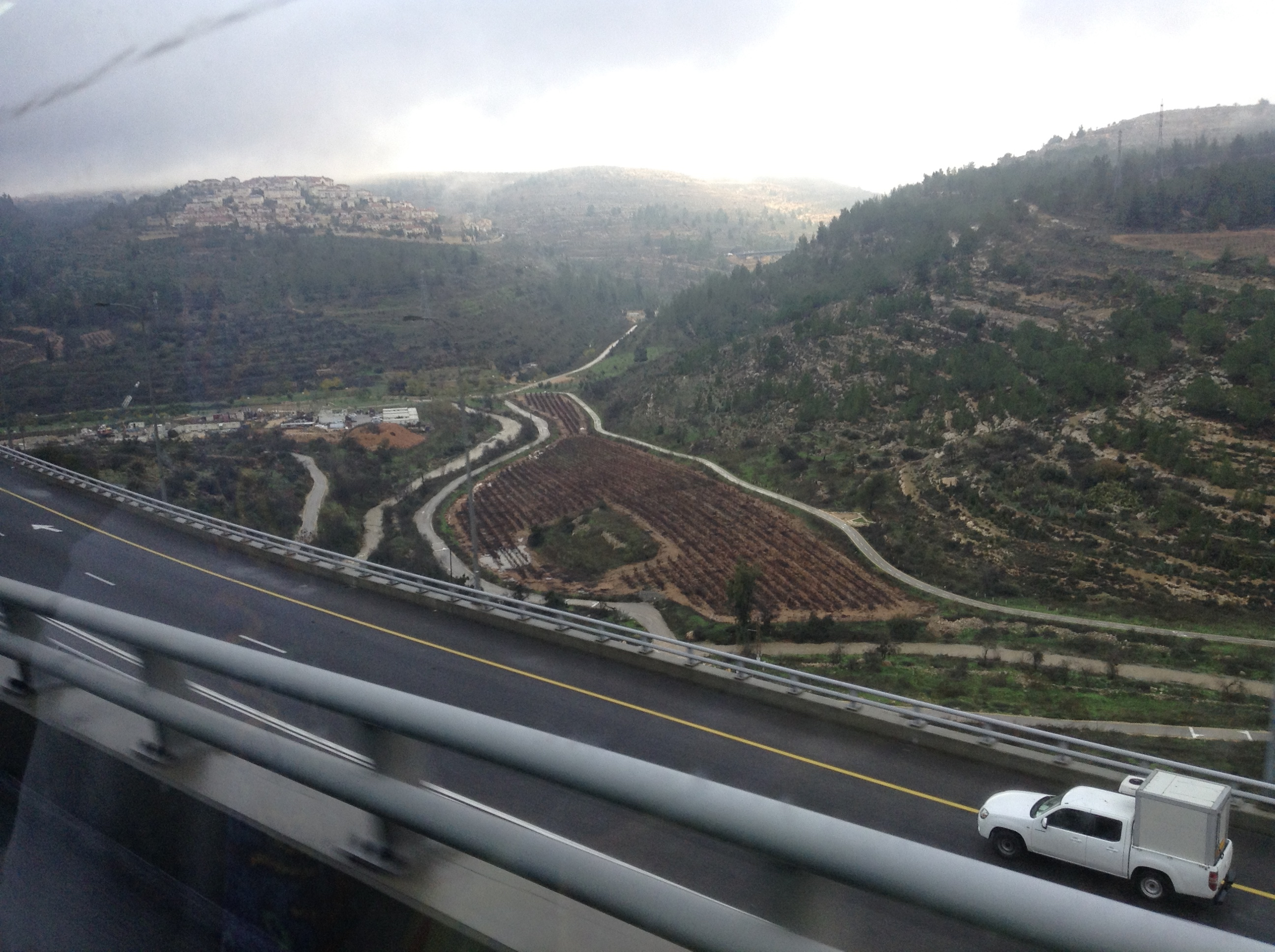
- Highway 1 near Jerusalem

Route information
- Part of (Ratified by Palestine but not by Israel)
- Length: 94 km (58 mi)

Major junctions
- West end: Tel Aviv (Kibbutz Galuyot Interchange)
- Kibbutz Galuyot Interchange; Ganot Interchange; Shapirim Interchange; Lod Interchange; Ben Shemen Interchange; Daniel Interchange; Latrun Interchange; Sha'ar HaGai Interchange; Yigael Yadin Interchange; Sha'ar Mizrah Interchange
- East end: Jordan Valley (Beit HaArava Junction)

Location
- Country: Israel
- Major cities: Tel Aviv, Holon, Rishon LeZion, Yehud, Lod, Modi'in, Beit Shemesh, Mevaseret Zion, Jerusalem, Ma'ale Adummim, Jericho

Highway system
- Roads in Israel; Highways
→ Highway 2

Highway 1 (Hebrew: כביש 1, Kvish Ahat; Arabic: الطريق السريع 1) is the main highway in Israel, connecting Tel Aviv and Jerusalem, and continuing eastwards to the Jordan Valley in the West Bank.

== Highway ==
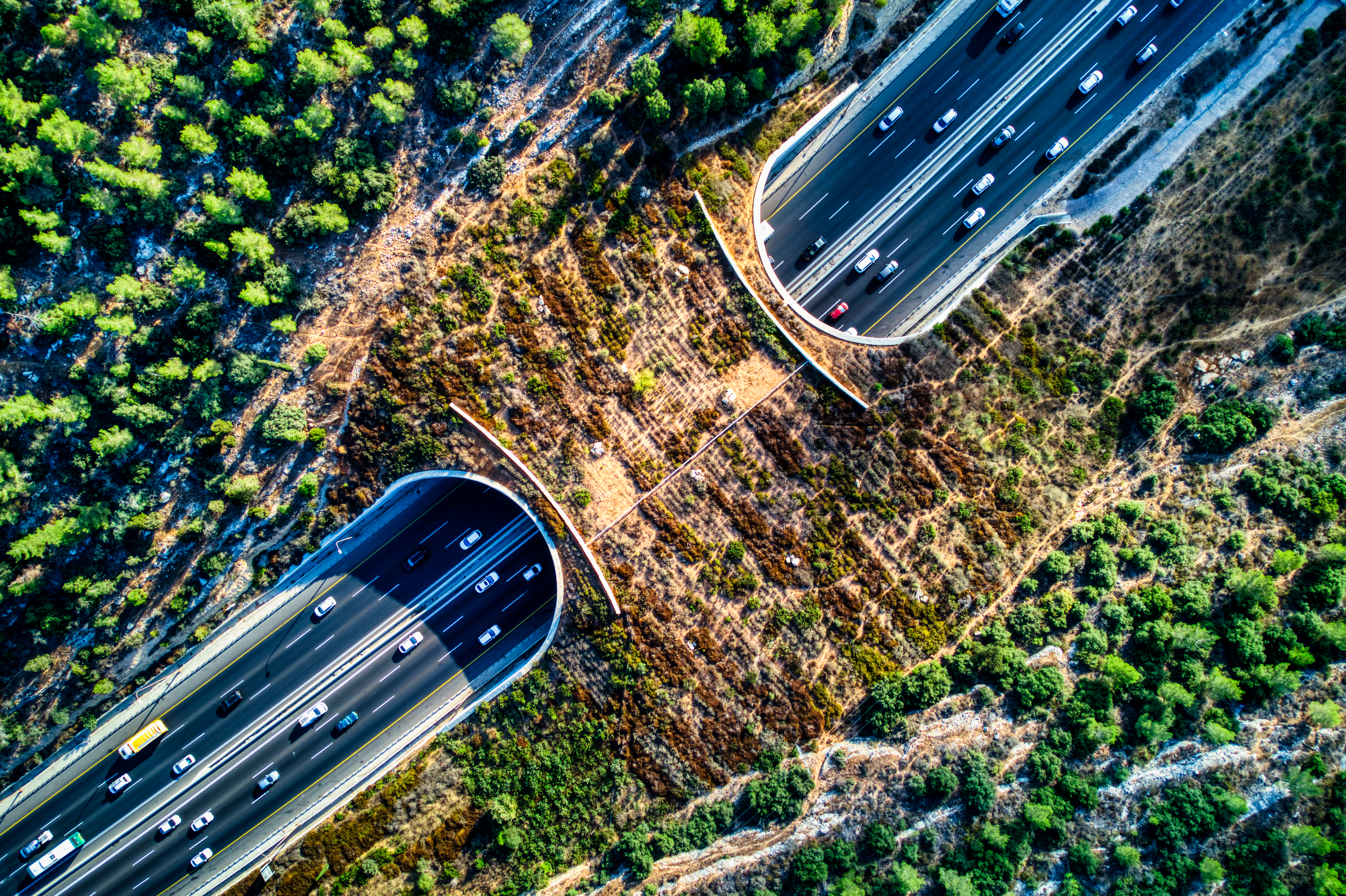
Wildlife crossing, Highway 1

=== Tel Aviv to Jerusalem ===
==== The coastal plain and Judean foothills ====
The route begins as a six-lane freeway as it splits off from the Ayalon Highway (Highway 20) just north of the Kibbutz Galuyot Interchange in Tel Aviv at an elevation of 16 meters above sea level travelling 0.7 km due south-southeast following the course of the Ayalon Stream. It then turns southeast, continuing past the 70 meter high Hiriya landfill, intersects Highway 4 and Route 412 and passes the Tel Aviv toll express lanes and park-and-ride facility. Israel Railways maintains tracks along the median of the highway along this section. A separate express toll lane runs along the three westbound lanes between Ben Gurion and Kibbutz Galuyot interchanges.

The road then makes an S-curve as it passes Ben Gurion International Airport and crosses north of the Ayalon Stream. Continuing south-southeast, the road intersects with Highway 40, the cutoff to Route 443 East and Highway 6 (Trans Israel Highway) North where it narrows to four lanes and rises to an elevation of 93 meters at Ben Shemen. Passing Ben Shemen, the highway descends slightly as it turns south-by-west, running concurrently for 1.5 km with Highway 6 providing access to Highway 6 South.

Leaving the Highway 6 concurrency, the road again turns south-southeast, travelling through the Ayalon Valley where it once again widens to six lanes and intersects with Highway 431 just south of Modi'in. At this point, Israel's longest bridge, part of the Tel Aviv-Jerusalem High-Speed Railway, can be seen in the valley to the north. The road crosses the Ayalon Stream and ascends to 250 meters as it briefly crosses the Green Line (the 1949 Armistice Line) for 1.5 km and back again at Latrun. The road then travels briefly alongside the Ilan Stream, approaching Sha'ar HaGai (The Valley Gate) at 300 meters above sea level. At the Sha'ar HaGai Interchange, an Ottoman caravanserai is visible on the south side of the highway.

==== Ascent to Jerusalem ====
Passing through Sha'ar HaGai, Highway 1 begins a pronounced ascent through the Judean Mountains at a point between the Mishlatim Ridge to the north and the Shayarot Ridge and the famous Burma Road to the south. Along this section, abandoned rusted military vehicles have been preserved along the sides of the road to commemorate the efforts of the armoured supply convoys that attempted to break through the siege of Jerusalem during 1948 Palestine war. Past Shoresh, the road reaches an elevation of 715 meters along the northern ridge of the Kisalon Valley at Kiryat Ye'arim (Telz-Stone). It then descends to 610 meters as it passes Abu Gosh while crossing the Kisalon Stream at Ein Hemed, and then again ascends, reaching 680 meters as it enters the Harel Tunnels, bypassing Mount Ma'oz and Castel National Park at Mevaseret Zion. At this point, the road descends to 610 meters, where it passes on the Motza bridge over the Sorek Stream and Valley, bypassing Motza.

=== Through Jerusalem ===
Now within the municipal limits of Jerusalem, the road continues northeast and begins the final ascent to the city. On the northern slopes below Har HaMenuchot, the road splits at Sha'ar Moriah Interchange, completed in 2007. Before 2007, Highway 1 continued its ascent via Ben Gurion Boulevard, negotiating three wide curves and three tight curves ending at the historic western entrance to Jerusalem at the beginning of Jaffa Road. Since that time, the road, as numbered now, descends from the interchange into the Valley of Cedars (Emek HaArazim).

In the Valley of Cedars, the road known as Jerusalem Road 9 passes through tunnels under a hill on the north side of the Sorek Stream. It then crosses the Green Line next to Ramot at an elevation of 630 meters as it intersects with Route 436 and Highway 50 (Begin Boulevard) at Yigael Yadin Interchange, becoming a four-lane divided highway with traffic-light controlled junctions. Travelling due east, the road, also called Yigael Yadin Boulevard, passes Har Hotzvim and Ramat Shlomo, ascending to its highest elevation of 815 meters as it intersects with the heavily congested Sha'ar Mizrach Junction (East Gate) at Shu'afat and French Hill. At this point, the road crosses the tracks of the Jerusalem Light Rail and intersects with Highway 60, marking the watershed of the Judean Mountains.

Passing Sha'ar Mizrah, the road is called Derech Ma'ale Adumim. The greenery typical of the western side of the watershed is replaced by the eastern side's stark mountain-desert shades of beige. The road turns southward and begins descending, passing the Shu'afat refugee camp and the Al-Issawiya neighbourhood. At this point, a new road alongside and separated from Highway 1 has been built that will become a connecting route between Ramallah and Bethlehem. Passing the At-Tur neighbourhood, the highway leaves Jerusalem at the Zeitim Security Checkpoint. After this point, the road is open to green (Palestinian) license plates.

=== Jerusalem to the Jordan Valley ===
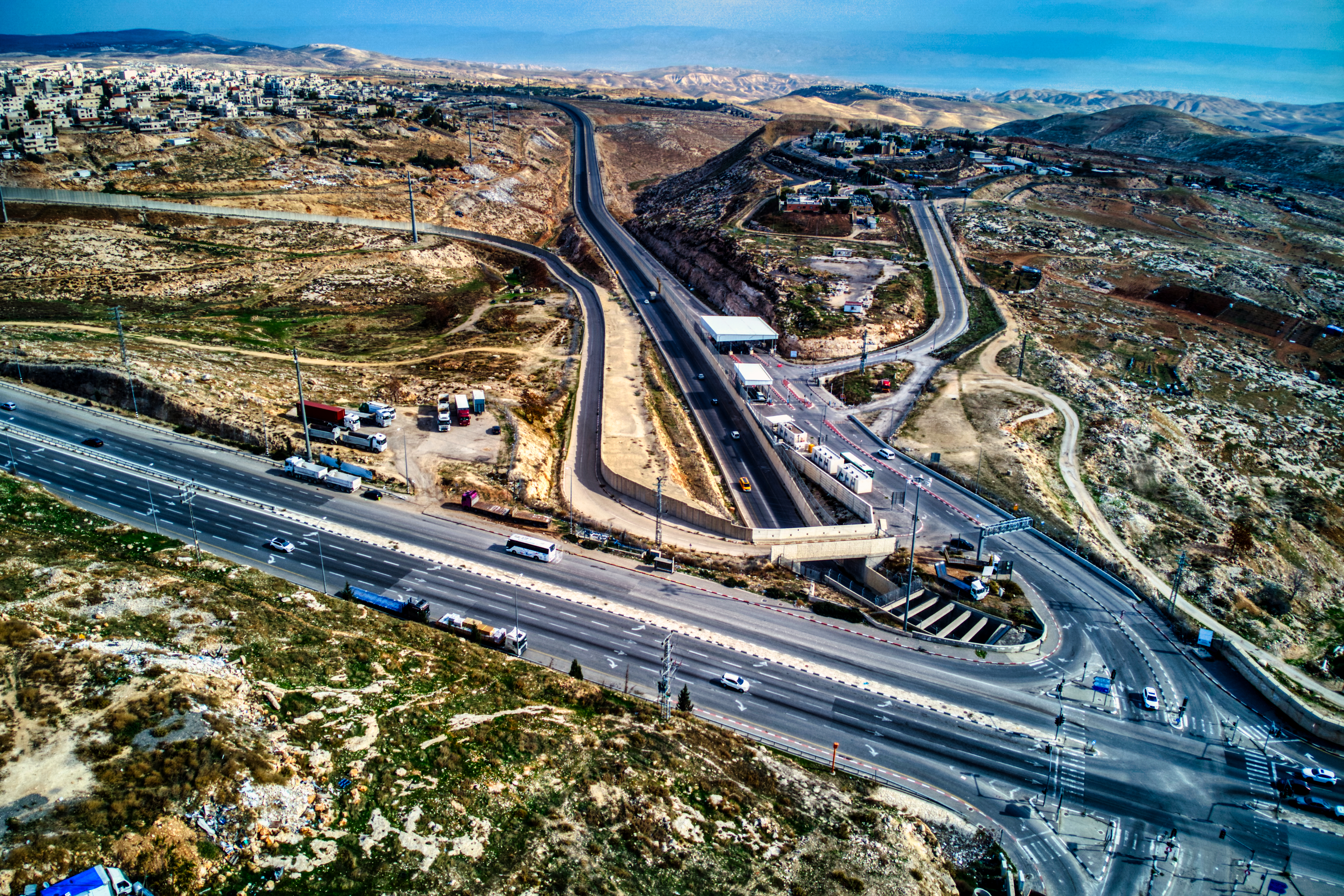
Highway 1 - Route 4370 Junction (Al-Issawiya Junction)

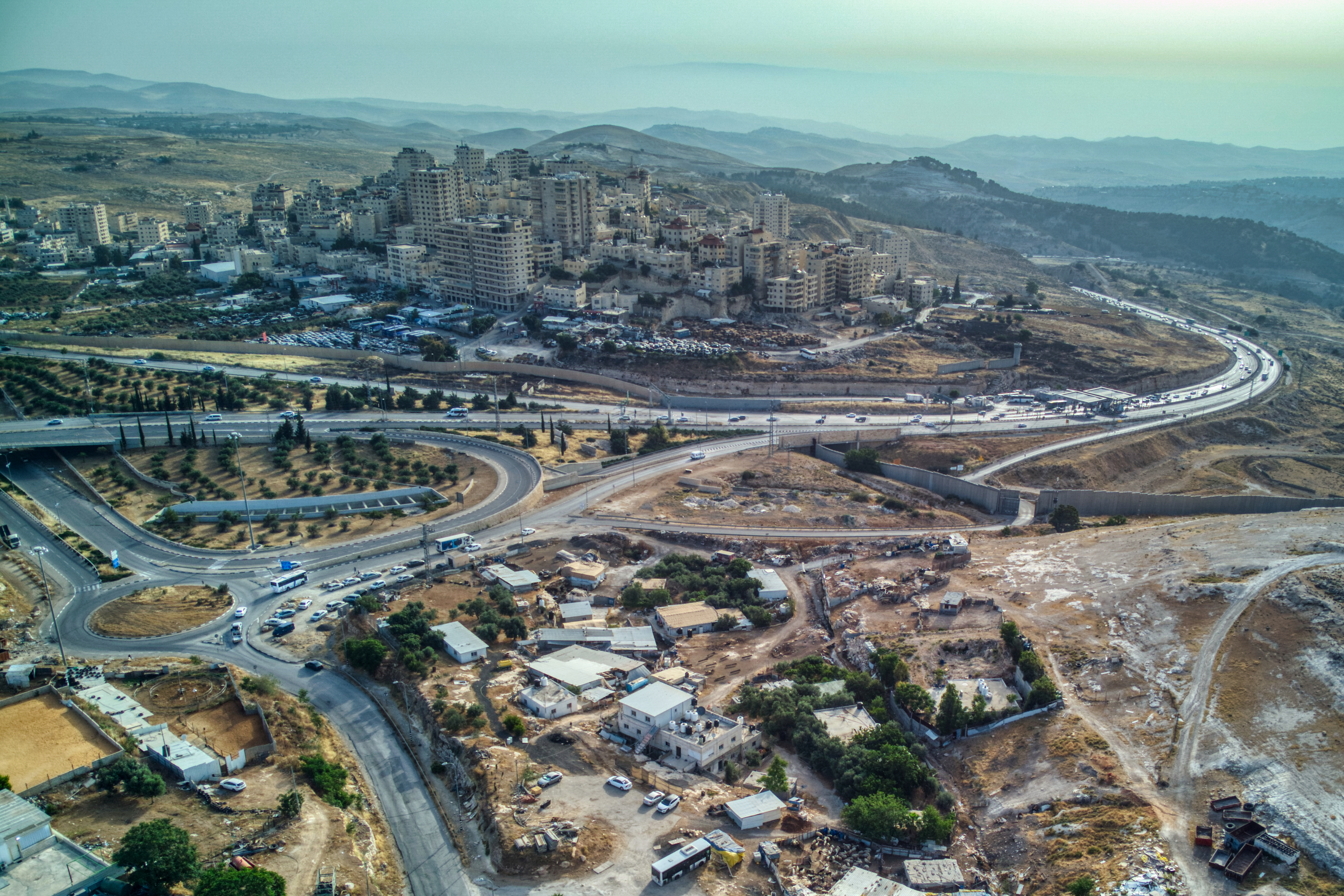
the village az-Za'ayyem and the az-Za'ayyem Checkpoint on Highway 1, near the Israeli West Bank barrier

Turning eastward after the checkpoint, Highway 1 descends steeply to 375 meters as it passes the Adumim Interchange with Route 417 providing access to Ma'ale Adumim, al-Eizariya and Abu Dis, joining the historic Jericho Road. The road turns east by northeast, continuing its descent, passing E1 (Jerusalem), Mishor Adumim and Route 437 at 250 meters. Levelling out for the next 5 km and occasionally rising in elevation, the road passes the Nahal Og Nature Reserve (Wadi Mukhalik), intersects with the Allon Road (Route 458) and the famous Khan Al-Ahmar, a caravanserai associated with the New Testament story of the Good Samaritan.

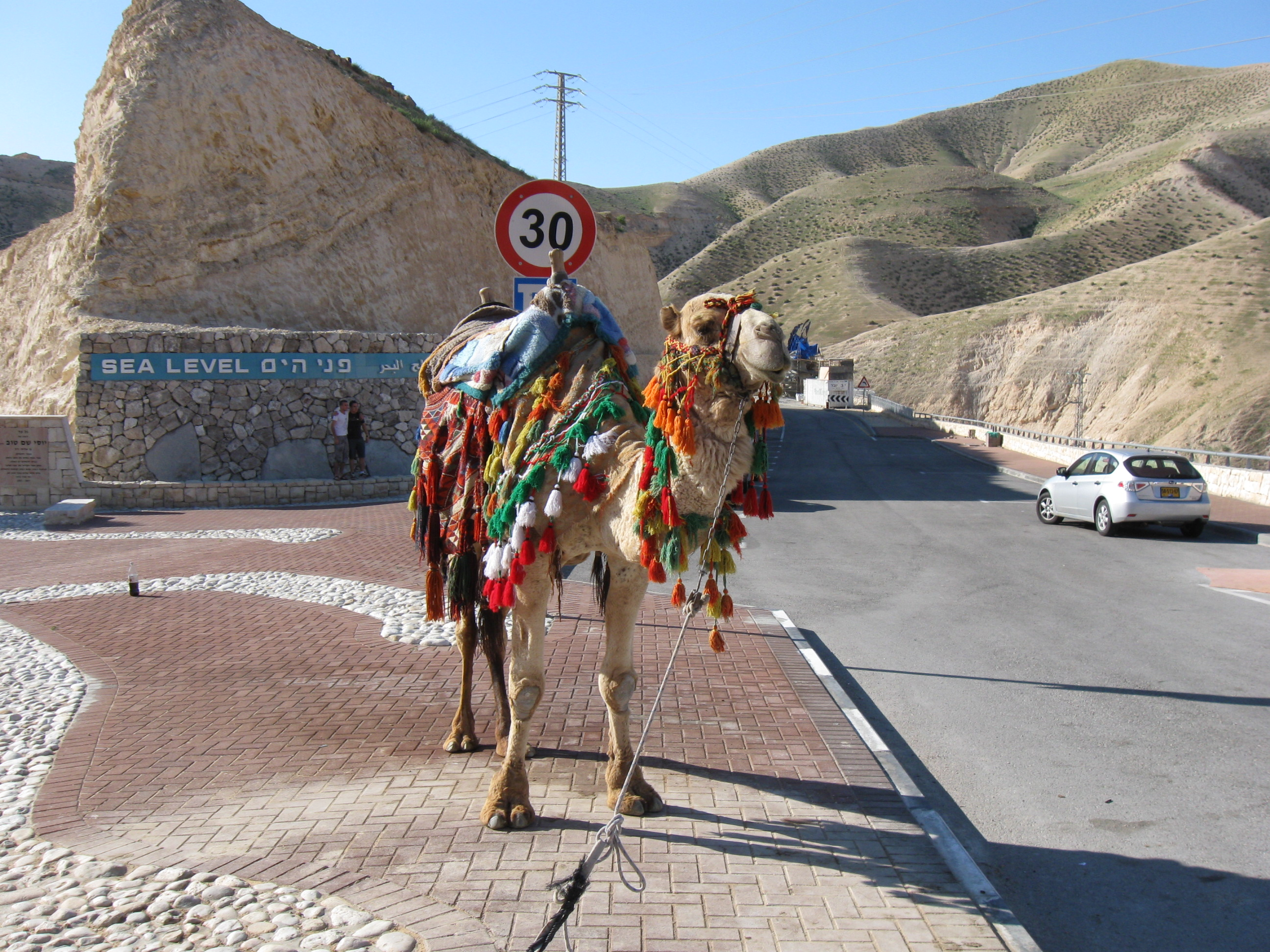
"Scenic Overlook" at Sea Level

Descending again, the road briefly turns due south as it passes Mitzpe Yeriho. Turning southeast, though travellers can stop at a scenic overlook at Sea Level (0 meters), the view of the Jordan Valley at this precise point is mostly obstructed because of the surrounding mountains. The attraction for tourists is to be photographed in front of the sea level sign and, for a price, sitting atop a colourfully decorated camel. The road then turns eastward and descends below sea level passing the entrance road to Nabi Musa, a pilgrimage site where Muslims believe Moses is buried. At 230 meters below sea level, the road passes Jericho Junction, providing access to Vered Yeriho and Jericho. Passing Beit HaArava, Highway 1 ends at Beit HaArava Junction with Highway 90 at an elevation of 325 meters below sea level.

== History ==
The section between Latrun and Jerusalem roughly follows an ancient path connecting Jaffa and Jerusalem. At the entrance to Jerusalem, the steep and winding rise was known as Ma'aleh HaRoma'im (Romans' Ascent), covering a 3 kilometres (1.9 mi) path rising 200 metres (660 ft) in altitude. The Jaffa–Jerusalem road was initially made accessible for wheeled vehicles by the Ottomans in 1867 and since then served as the main highway to Jerusalem, favoured over more topographically convenient routes such as Route 443. The largest bell for the church of the Augusta Victoria complex, built between 1907 and 1910, weighed six tonnes and required that the road be widened and paved.

In 1948, the Latrun section of the highway was taken over by Jordan, and traffic was diverted to a new route called "Derekh Ha'Gvura" (Road of Bravery), which is now part of Highways 44 and 38. In 1965, the old highway was widened to four lanes between Sha'ar HaGai and Jerusalem. After the Six-Day War, the Latrun section was reopened, and an interchange was built at Mevaseret Zion(Harel Interchange). During the 1970s, a bypass was built around the village of Abu Ghosh, including the construction of Hemed Interchange.

=== The coastal plain and Judean foothills ===
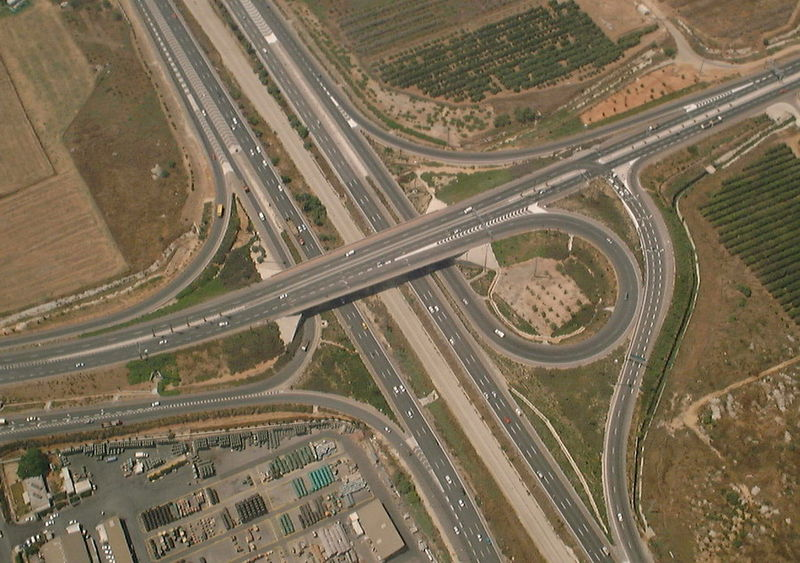
Highway 1 passing under Route 412 at Shapirim Interchange

In 1978, a new section opened, connecting former Road 10 (the Tel Aviv – Ben Gurion Airport road) with Sha'ar HaGai. The new section formed the third freeway in the country, after Highways 2 and 4. Although it is about 10 km longer than the old road (now Highway 44 and Route 424), it is much faster. One of the first passengers on this section was Egyptian President Anwar Sadat during his historic visit to Israel in 1977. This section briefly crosses over the Green Line near Latrun.

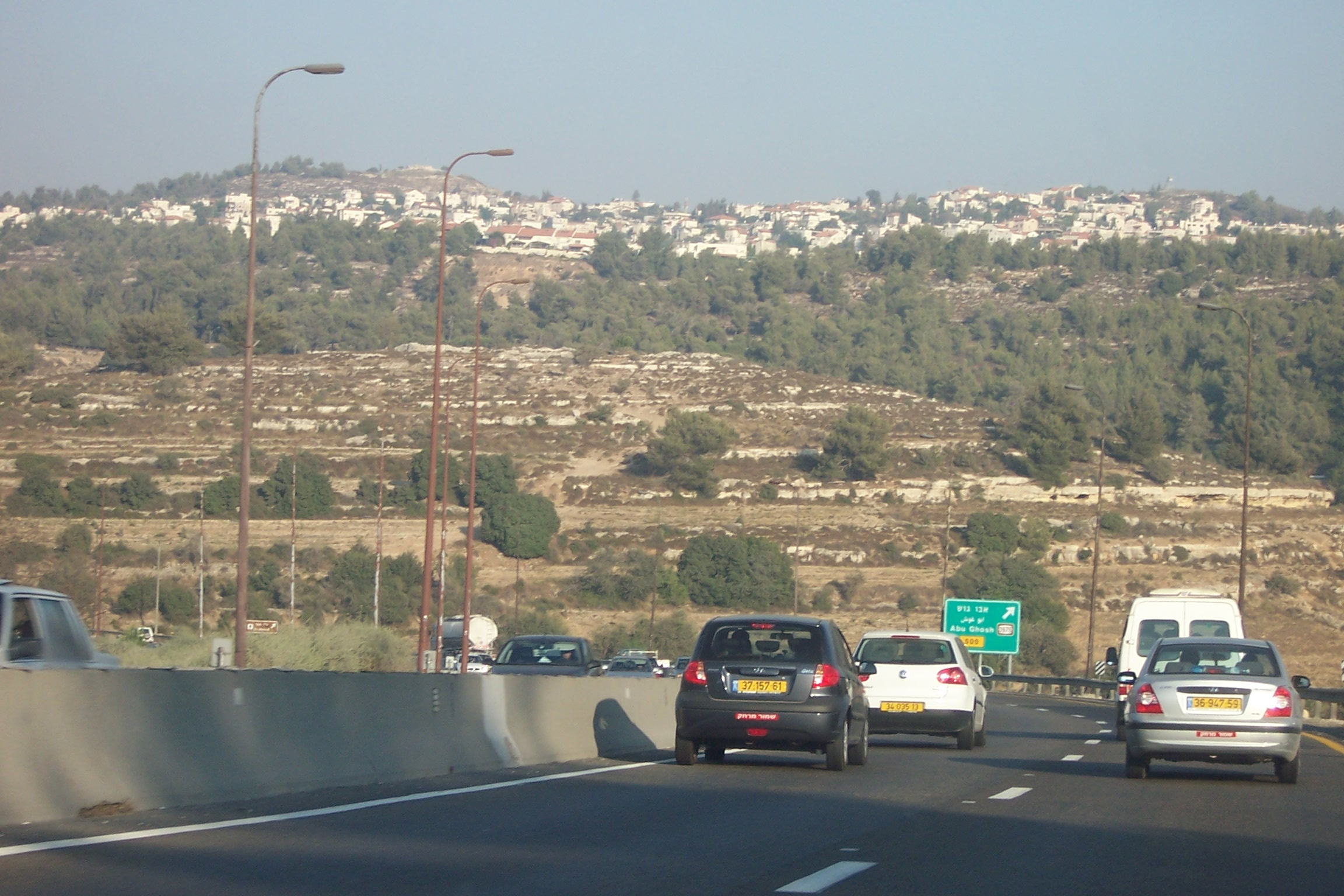
Highway 1 traffic eastward, approaching the Hemed interchange and Abu Ghosh exit, before the extensive upgrade and reconstruction of the road that began in 2013.

The section between Ganot Interchange and Ben Shemen Interchange was widened to six lanes in 1998. During the construction of Highway 6 (1999–2003), the Ben Shemen Interchange was rebuilt, and a new interchange was built near the village of Kfar Daniel. The Daniel Interchange is a 1 1/2 km straight, eight-lane segment where Highways 1 and 6 run concurrently, providing 1-west to 6-north and 1-east to 6-south high-speed interchange.

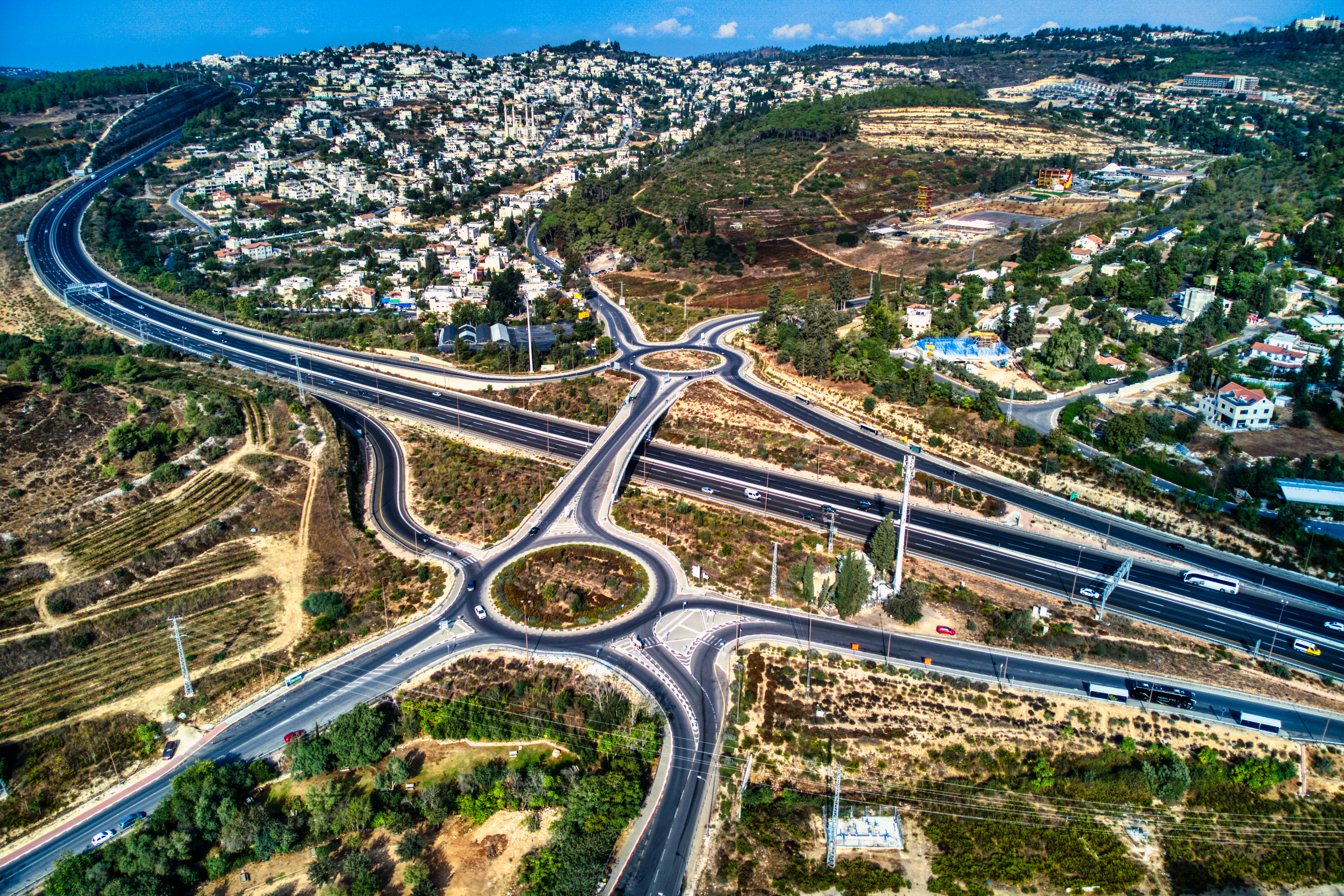
Hemed Interchange - in the front Ein Hemed Park and in the background Abu Ghosh and Beit Nekofa

Anava Interchange opened on February 4, 2009, together with the eastern section of Route 431. It is a complex interchange and the first complete freeway to freeway interchange in the country, connecting all eight directions between the two freeways without the use of traffic lights.

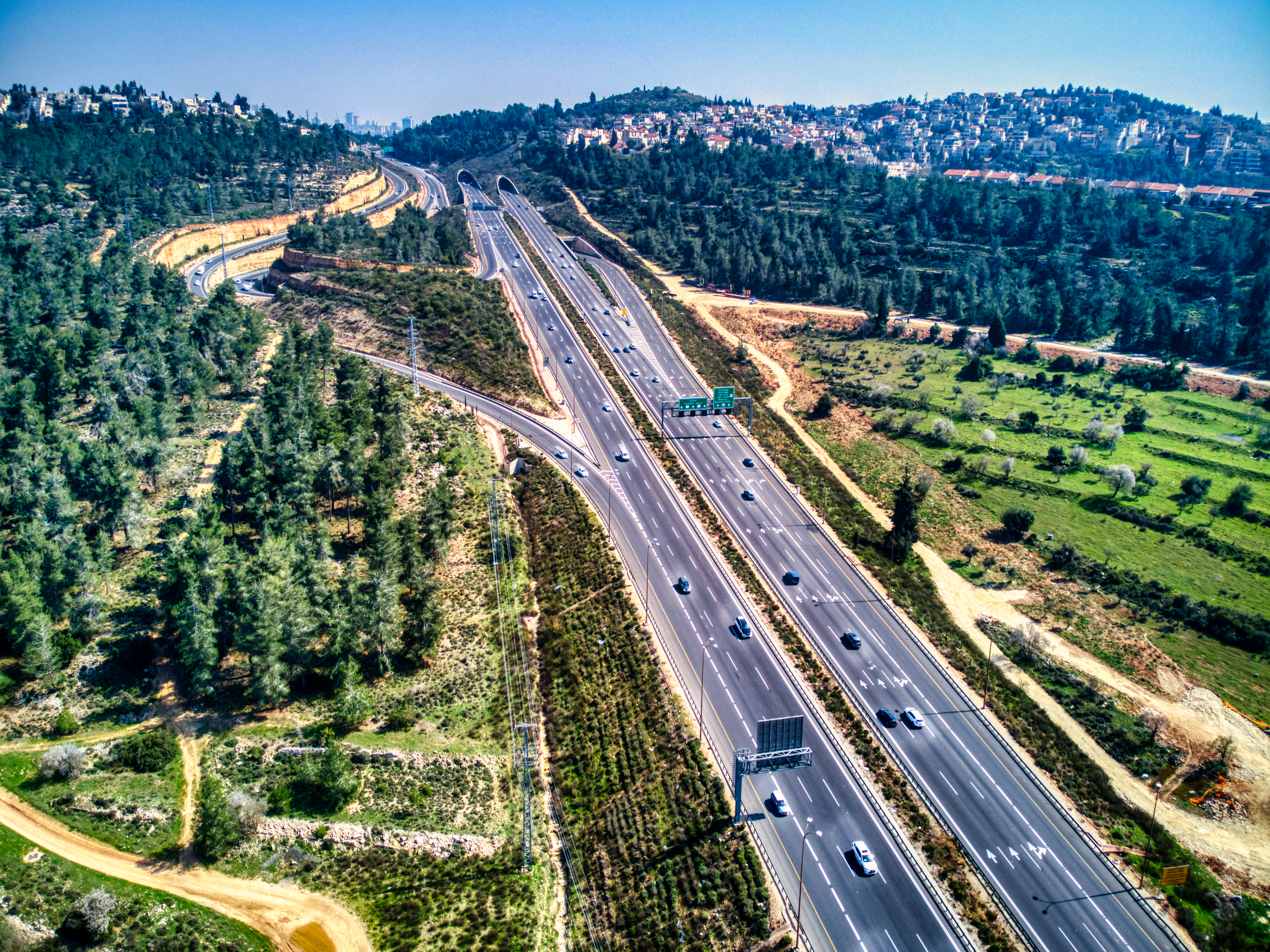
Highway 1 climbs and enters Harel Tunnels

To relieve congestion at the entrance to Tel Aviv, a high-occupancy toll lane was built as a Build-Operate-Transfer project. The project included additional lanes between Ben Gurion Airport and Kibutz Galuyot Interchange and a large park and ride facility east of Shapirim Interchange. Shapir Engineering started the construction of the park-and-ride facility in August 2007, and the project was completed in 2010.

=== Highway 16 ===
Just as Jerusalem Road 9 provided traffic relief to motorists headed to northern and eastern Jerusalem by bypassing the main western entrance to the city, Highway 16 created another entrance to Jerusalem and provide direct access to central and southern Jerusalem from the west. The road connects Highway 1 at the new Motza Interchange to Jerusalem's Highway 50 (Begin Boulevard) at Givat Mordechai Interchange. The road travels mostly through a series of tunnels under the west Jerusalem neighbourhoods of Har Nof and Yefeh Nof and the parking lots of Shaare Zedek Medical Center with an intermediate Nahal Revida Interchange leading to Givat Shaul. The road opened in 2022. The plan had to pass stiff resistance on ecological grounds due to the above ground section at Nahal Revida located in the Jerusalem Forest. After many delays, the contract for construction was finally awarded in August 2018, and it was completed in 2022.

=== Ascent to Jerusalem ===
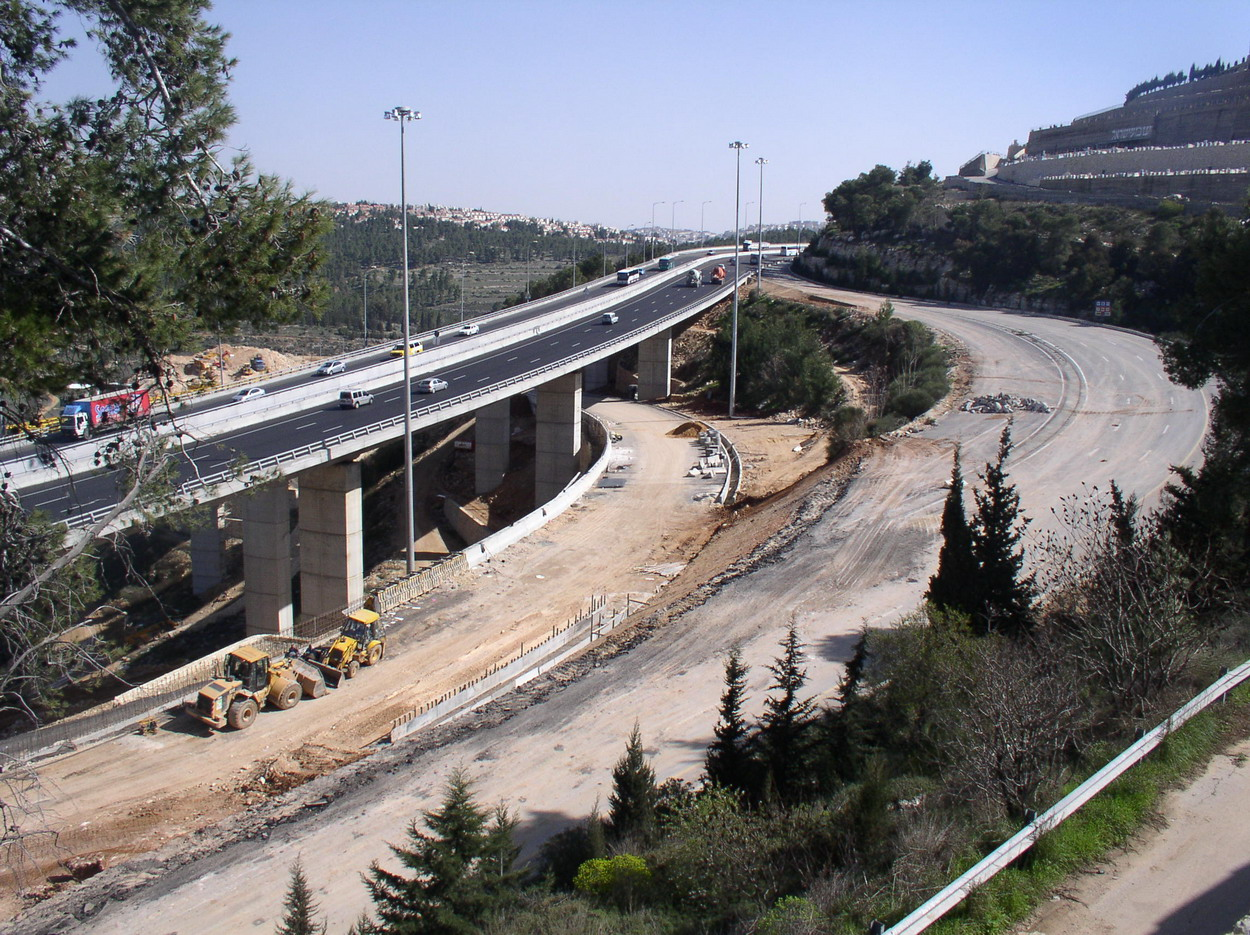
Sha'ar Moriah Interchange - Highway 1 via Jerusalem Road 9 under construction

Motza interchange opened in 1990, and the Sha'ar HaGai Interchange opened in 1995. In 1998, the eastbound left turn to Abu Ghosh, Ma'ale HaHamisha and Kiryat Anavim was closed. Finally, in 2002, Shoresh Interchange opened, eliminating the last left turn on the highway between Tel Aviv and Jerusalem. At this point, the Sha'ar HaGai–Jerusalem section was fully grade separated. However, the road did not meet freeway standards due to narrow shoulders, dangerous turns and difficult slopes, and the speed limit on this section was 80 km/h.

Upgrading this section with additional lanes and gentler curves was approved by the Committee on National Projects after many years of opposition from ecological groups and local governmental authorities. Also, according to this plan, the uni-directional Kiryat Ye'arim Interchange was rebuilt to allow access to eastbound traffic, a tunnel was built under the Castel Mountain (HarEl) with more efficient entry and exit ramps and a long bridge was built to straighten the dangerous Motza curve. The soil extracted from the tunnel was used to widen the Shoresh–Sha'ar HaGai section, raising the road by five meters to straighten the curves and widen the road from four to six lanes with wider shoulders.

Opposition on ecological grounds to the Sha'ar HaGai-Shoresh section that passes through a sensitive nature reserve has been addressed by the inclusion of a 70-meter wide eco-bridge as part of the plan. Additionally, the quality of life issues raised by the leaders of the nearby communities were all rejected.

By February 2012, the National Roads Authority published requests for tender (invitation for bids) for the Sha'ar HaGai-Shoresh section and the HarEl Tunnel to be implemented as design–build projects. By January 2014 extensive infrastructure works were taking place along the entire project's route. They were completed in late 2017 at a total cost of approximately NIS 2.5 billion.

=== Jerusalem to the Jordan Valley ===
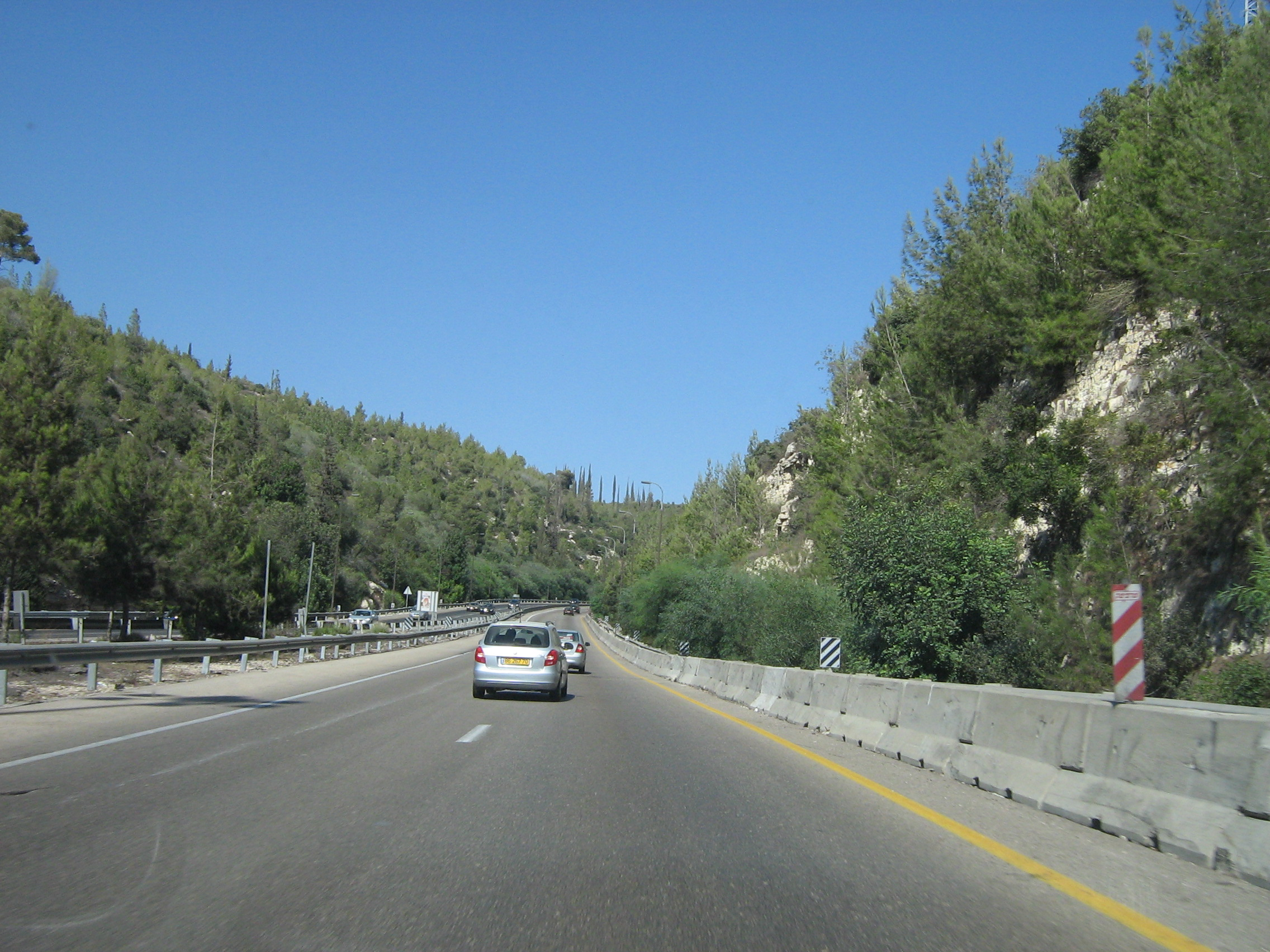
Typical section of Highway 1 between Sha'ar Hag'ai and Jerusalem before the extensive upgrade and reconstruction of the road that was carried out in the years 2013–2017.

The British first built the section of the highway east of Jerusalem in the 1920s along the path of an ancient road to the Dead Sea. This section was under Jordanian control between 1948 and 1967 and renewed access to this road, which is known as the "Jericho Road" (Hebrew: דרך יריחו) or the Adummim Ascent (Hebrew: מעלה אדומים), was famously noted alongside the reunification of Jerusalem in the famous Israeli song, Jerusalem of Gold.

In the late 1980s, a new road was built north of Jericho Road, between French Hill neighbourhood in northern Jerusalem and the town of Ma'ale Adummim. This section was improved by 1995 when it was widened, and a new interchange was built at Ma'ale Adummim. A bypass of this section, designed to relieve congestion at Sha'ar Mizrah Junction, opened in 2002, connecting the highway through two 2-lane tunnels under Mount Scopus towards the Hebrew University, Bar-Ilan Street and central Jerusalem. As part of this project, the new HaZeitim interchange was built at the foot of the Mount of Olives.

The section between Ma'ale Adummim and Jericho was widened to four lanes in the early 2010s.

=== Through Jerusalem ===
The sections west and east of Jerusalem are linked by an expressway segment running north of the city centre. Known internally as Yigael Yadin road or 'Jerusalem Road 9', the stretch has divided lanes but includes several at-grade intersections alongside its interchanges.

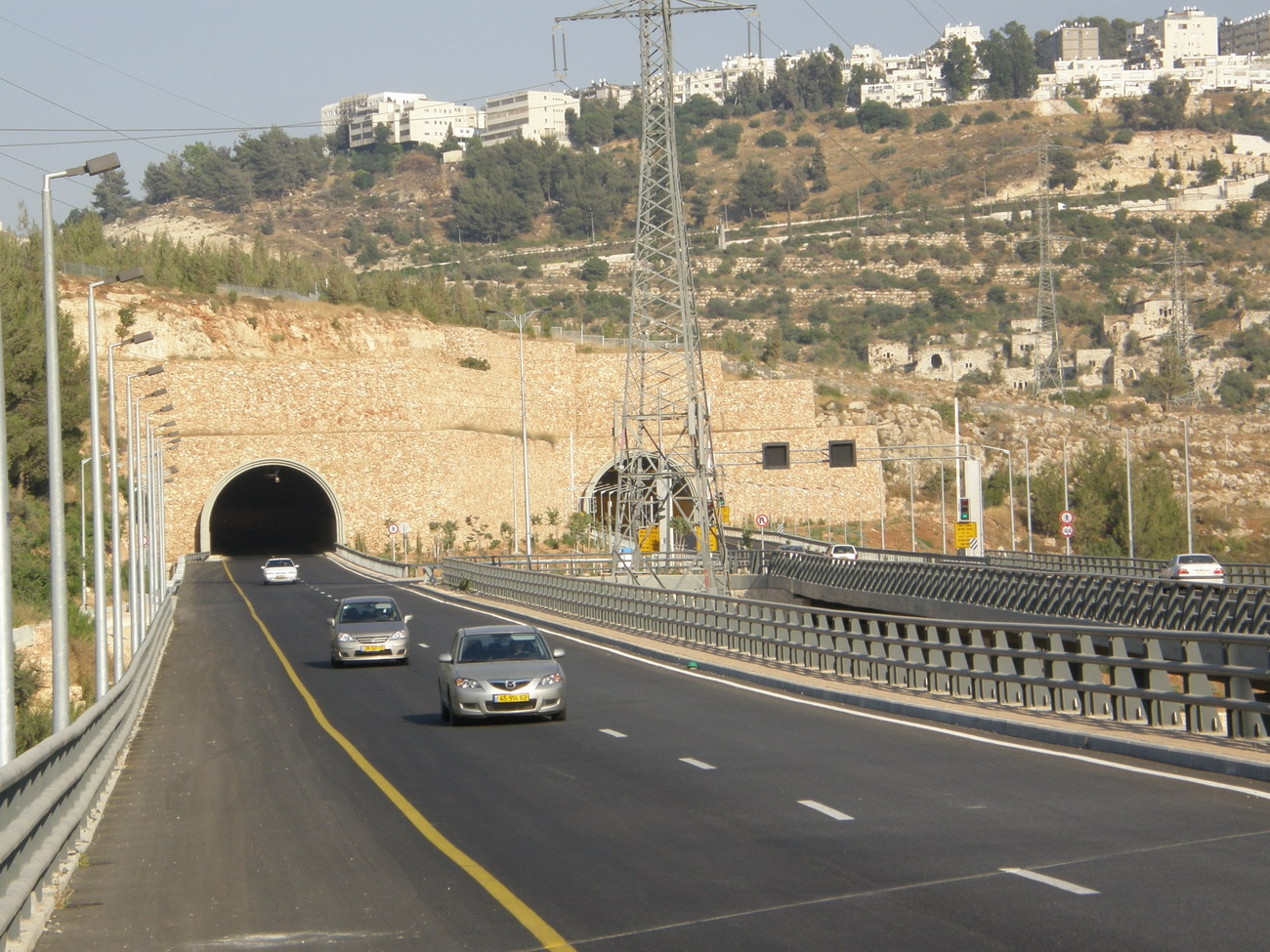
Twin tunnels and bridges on Jerusalem Road 9

In 2001 Moriah, the Jerusalem Development Company started building a bypass of the city's oft-congested western entrance, designated as 'Jerusalem Road 9'. Before it was built, travellers from the west of Jerusalem who wished to reach the Dead Sea, or vice versa, had no better option than to drive through congested city streets. The road was intended to improve traffic flow in Ramot and nearby neighbourhoods.

The 3.6 km road descends from the purpose-built Sha'ar Moriah Interchange to allow continuous separate grade access to Yigael Yadin Interchange and the northern and eastern continuation of Highway 1. Passing through Emek HaArazim (Valley of Cedars), it includes two 400-meter tunnels (one for eastbound traffic and one for westbound), four bridges over the Sorek stream and two new interchanges.

While the highway was scheduled for completion in early 2005, work was slowed to a near halt between 2003 and 2006, and completion was postponed for over two years. The opening, planned for May 21, 2007, was postponed another two months due to Moriah's failure to complete the required environmental mitigation. Permission to open the road was granted on condition that the company and Jerusalem municipality guarantee completion of environmental mitigation after the opening. Road 9 opened on July 25, 2007 and constitutes part of Highway 1.

In October, 2014, Jerusalem Road 9 was officially renamed "Yitzhak Shamir Road" after Israel's 7th Prime Minister.

== Development plans ==
Israel Railways has built a new high-speed rail line between Tel Aviv and Jerusalem. This line crosses the highway at three points: over a viaduct east of Ben Gurion Airport, in a tunnel at Anava Interchange and another tunnel at the western entrance to Jerusalem.

In late 2021, construction began on a new interchange that will provide additional access to Ben Gurion Airport from Highway 1. It will significantly reduce the distance vehicles must travel to access the airport's main terminal from the direction of Tel Aviv and other points north and west of the airport.

A plan to add lanes and reconfigure the highway between Tel Aviv and the Shapirim interchange will be carried out as part of the four-tracking project of the Tel Aviv-Lod railway expected to take place in the mid-2020s decade.

An interchange at Ramat Shlomo is currently under construction. Once completed, it will replace the current signalized intersection. It is also designed to provide an additional route to the Har Hotzvim High-Tech area. Moriya is also planning to build a 1.5 km tunnel at Sha'ar Mizrah Junction. This tunnel will allow east-west traffic to bypass the current signalized intersections and provide direct access to Jerusalem's northeastern neighbourhoods. Once these two projects are completed, there will be only one at-grade intersection left along the highway between Tel Aviv and Adummim, at Isawiya.

== Interchanges and Junctions (West to East) ==
District	Location	km	mi	Name	Destinations	Notes
Tel Aviv	HaTikva	0	0.0	מחלף קיבוץ גלויות (Kibutz Galuyot Interchange)	Highway 2; Highway 20; Route 461	
Central	Ganot	4.5	2.8	מחלף גנות (Ganot Interchange)	Highway 4	
Central	Beit Dagan	6.6	4.1	מחלף שפירים (Shapirim Interchange)	Route 412	Named after nearby Shapirim Stream
Central	Kfar Habad	8.1	5.0	כניסה לחניון חנה וסע (Entrance to park and ride facility)	Entrance road	High-occupancy toll lane
Central	Ben Gurion International Airport	13	8.1	מחלף בן גוריון (Ben Gurion Interchange)	Road 4503	Named after airport
Central	Lod	14.8	9.2	מחלף לוד (Lod Interchange)	Highway 40	
Central	Ben Shemen	18.8	11.7	מחלף בן שמן (Ben Shemen Interchange)	Highway 6; Route 443; Route 444	
Central	Kfar Daniel	20.1	12.5	מחלף דניאל (Daniel Interchange)	Highway 6	
Central	Kfar Shmuel	25.4	15.8	מחלף ענבה (Anava Interchange)	Route 431	
Green Line
Judea and Samaria	Latrun	34.4	21.4	מחלף לטרון (Latrun Interchange)	Highway 3	
Green Line
Jerusalem	Sha'ar HaGai	38.6	24.0	מחלף שער הגיא (Sha'ar HaGai Interchange)	Highway 38	
Jerusalem	Shoresh	45.5	28.3	מחלף שורש (Shoresh Interchange)	Road 3955	
Jerusalem	Neve Ilan	46.9	29.1	מחלף נווה אילן (Neve Ilan Interchange)	Route 425	
Jerusalem	Kiryat Anavim	50.2	31.2	מחלף חמד (Hemed Interchange)	Road 3975	
Jerusalem	Mevaseret Zion	52.2	32.4	מחלף הראל (Har'el Interchange)	Road 3965; Harel Street	
Jerusalem	Mevaseret Zion	52.2	32.4	מנהרות הראל (Har'el Tunnels) – 2×3 lanes		800 meters
Jerusalem	Motza	54.7	34.0	מחלף מוצא (Motza Interchange)	Sorek Street; Highway 16	
Jerusalem	Har HaMenuchot	56	35	מחלף שער מוריה (Moriah Gate Interchange)	Route 333	
Jerusalem	Emek HaArazim	57.6	35.8	מנהרות שורק (Sorek Tunnels) – 2×2 lanes		400 metres
Jerusalem	Ramot neighborhood	58.6	36.4	מחלף יגאל ידין (Yigael Yadin Interchange)	Route 436; Highway 50	Named after Yigael Yadin
Green Line
Jerusalem	Ramat Shlomo	60.5	37.6	צומת רמת שלמה (Ramat Shlomo Junction)	Rabbi Druck Street	
Jerusalem	French Hill; Shuafat	62.4	38.8	מחלף שער מזרח (East Gate Interchange)	Highway 60	
Jerusalem	Shuafat Refugee Camp	62.8	39.0	צומת שדרות משה דיין (Moshe Dayan Boulevard Junction)	Moshe Dayan Blvd.	
Jerusalem	At-Tur	66.4	41.3	מחלף הזיתים (HaZeitim Interchange)	El-Hardub Street; Har HaTzofim	
Zeitim Security Checkpoint; NO westbound through-traffic for green (Palestinian Authority) license plates
Judea and Samaria	Ma'ale Adumim	72.3	44.9	מחלף אדומים (Adumim Junction)	Route 417	
Judea and Samaria	Mishor Adumim	74.7	46.4	צומת מישור אדומים (Mishor Adumim Junction)	Route 437; HaHevra HaCalcalit Blvd.	
Judea and Samaria	Kfar Adumim	77.3	48.0	צומת כפר אדומים (Kfar Adumim Junction)	Route 458	
Judea and Samaria	Khan Al-Ahmar	78.6	48.8	מחלף השומרוני הטוב (The Good Samaritan Interchange)	Entrance road	
Judea and Samaria	Mitzpe Yeriho	82.2	51.1	צומת מצפה יריחו (Mitzpe Yeriho Junction)	Road 4581	
Judea and Samaria	Nabi Musa	87.5	54.4	צומת נבי מוסא (Nabi Musa Junction)	Local road	
Judea and Samaria	Almog	90	56	צומת אלמוג (Almog Junction)	Road 4570	
Judea and Samaria	Beit HaArava	92	57	צומת בית הערבה (Beit HaArava Junction)	Road 4376	
Judea and Samaria	Beit HaArava	94	58	צומת בית הערבה (Beit HaArava Junction)	Highway 90	
1.000 mi = 1.609 km; 1.000 km = 0.621 mi

== Hazardous road ==
28.5 km of highway 1 had been declared as a red road by the Israeli police in 2015.
