= Kroizer =

Kroizer is a surname. Notable people with the surname include:

- Yehuda Kroizer (born 1955), Israeli rabbi
- Zundel Kroizer (1924–2014), Israeli rabbi
- Yitzhak kroizer knesset member from 2022
