= Antony of Choziba =

Byzantine hagiographer

Antony of Choziba, (Note: His first name may also be spelled Anthony.) also called Antony the Chozibite (fl. 634), was a Byzantine hagiographer from the monastery of Choziba. A disciple of George of Choziba, he wrote his teacher's biography (Vita sancti Georgii chozebitae) and also an account of some miracles attributed to the Virgin Mary (Miracula beatae virginis Mariae in Choziba). Both his works have been translated from Greek into English.

== Editions ==
- C. House, ed. "Vita Sancti Georgii Chozebitae Confessoris et Monachii". Analecta Bollandiana 7 (1888): 95–144, 336–359.
- C. House, ed. "Miracula beatae virginis Mariae in Choziba". Analecta Bollandiana 7 (1888): 360–370.
- T. Vivian and A. N. Athanassakis, trans. The Life of Saint George of Choziba and the Miracles of the Most Holy Mother of God at Choziba. San Francisco: International Scholars Publications, 1994.
