= Perat =

Perat (פרת) is the Hebrew name for two watercourses:

- The Euphrates, or Nehar Perat (נהר פרת)
- The Wadi Qelt, or Nahal Perat (נחל פרת)
