= Yitzhak Kroizer =

Israeli far-right politician

- יצחק קרויזר
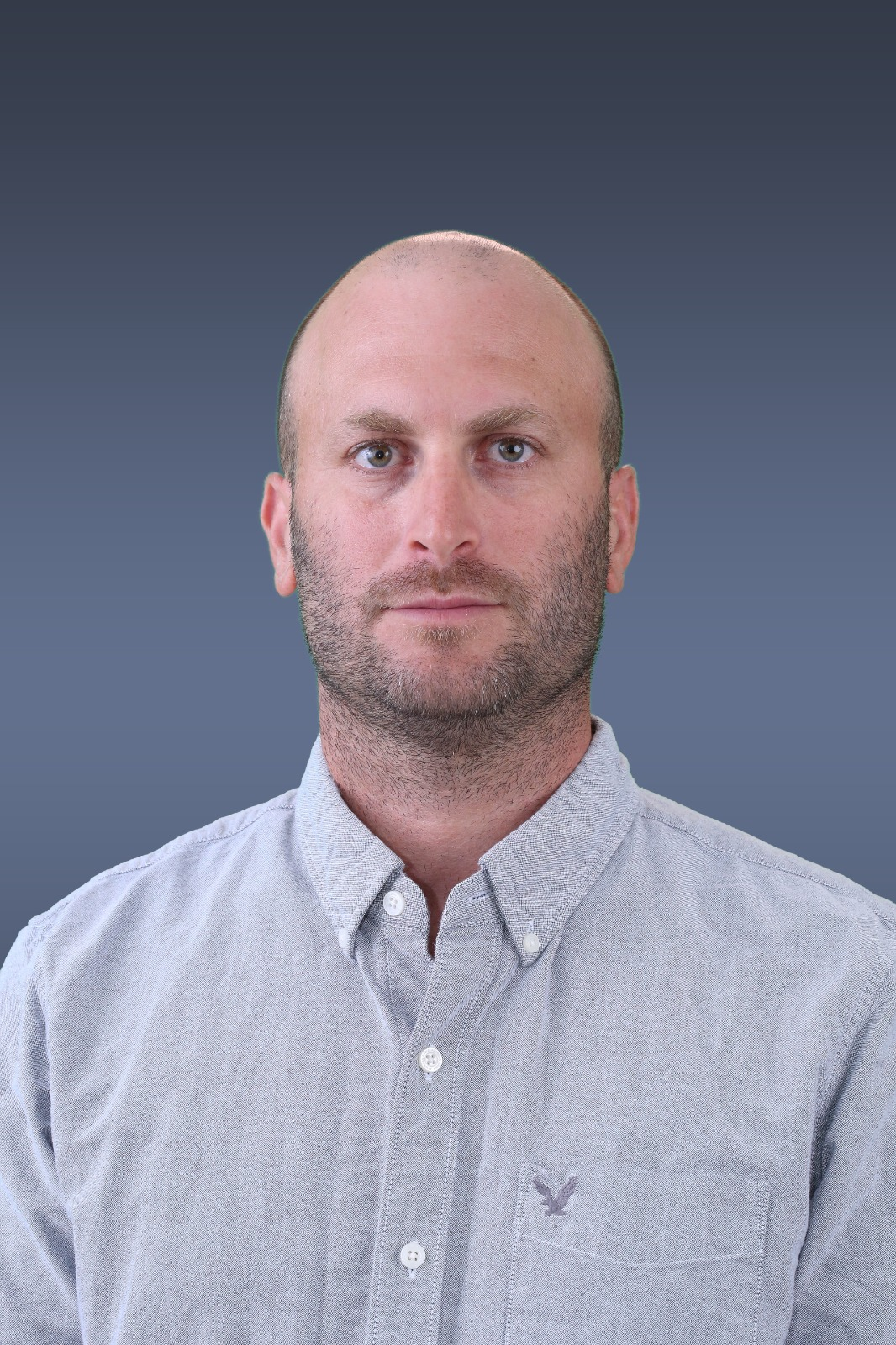
- Kroizer in 2022

Faction represented in the Knesset
- 2023–: Otzma Yehudit

Personal details
- Born: 7 September 1985 (age 41) Mitzpe Yeriho, Israel
- Spouse: Adi Kroizer
- Children: 3
- Parent: Yehuda Kroizer (father)
- Education: Technion – Israel Institute of Technology

Yitzhak Kroizer (Hebrew: יצחק קרויזר; born 7 September 1985) is an Israeli far-right politician who has served as a Member of the Knesset for Otzma Yehudit since 2023. He is a resident of the Golan Heights settlement of Natur.

== Early life and background ==
Kroizer is the son of Yehuda Kroizer, the local rabbi in Mitzpe Yeriho and the leader of Yeshivat HaRaayon HaYehudi, an organization founded by Meir Kahane.

He served in the Israel Defense Forces, and fought in the Second Lebanon War. In 2007, two of his brothers died in a car accident. Before entering politics, Kroizer was a farmer, and later ran a construction company.

== Political career ==
Kroizer is a member of the Otzma Yehudit party, and was given the fourth spot on its list in 2020. However, he was not elected as the party won no seats.

In 2022, Kroizer was given the fifteenth spot on the party's joint list with the Religious Zionist Party and Noam ahead of that year's election. Kroizer was not elected as the list won 14 seats.

=== Knesset tenure ===
He entered the Knesset on 1 January 2023, following the resignation of MK Amihai Eliyahu, who forfeited his seat to become a minister as part of the Norwegian Law.

In July 2023, Kroizer was selected to serve on the Judicial Selection Committee. Kroizer argued in September 2023 that the Israeli Supreme Court "tramples other authorities and citizens in Israel". Legislation sponsored by Kroizer to imprison children under the age of 14 for terror-related manslaughter advanced in the Knesset in June 2023.

He was appointed the head of the Knesset's Internal Affairs and Environment Committee in August 2025, replacing Ya'akov Asher.

== Controversies ==
On 5 November 2023, Kroizer explicitly called for the deaths of all residents of the Gaza Strip during an Army Radio interview, which implies incitement to genocide. During the interview, Kroizer stated:

“The Gaza Strip should be flattened, and there should be one sentence for everyone there – death. We have to wipe the Gaza Strip off the map. There are no innocents there.”

During a debate in the Knesset on 3 December 2025, he stated that the Israeli army should kill Palestinians who burn garbage in the West Bank.

On 26 March 2026, Krozier was filmed during a parliamentary session saying "There are no innocent civilians in Jenin, there are no innocent children in Jenin. I support the IDF soldiers in every situation, even if the incidental cost is children or women." In response, Knesset member and head of the Hadash–Ta'al party, Ayman Odeh filed a formal complaint to the Knesset Ethics Committee, stating that Krozier's comments "do severe harm to basic values of humanity, of human beings as human beings."

Following an event Kroizer attended with Itamar Ben-Gvir at the Temple Mount in May 2026, Kroizer called for the construction of the Third Temple, writing “The time has come to get rid of all the mosques and work to construct the Temple!”

Kroizer was investigated following clashes which took place in Mitzpe Yeriho as police were pursuing a settler in the area. He later filed a compliant with the Police Internal Investigations Department. Body camera footage has "strengthened" the case against Kroizer. Kroizer is expected to questioned on 12 October by the Israeli police under caution on suspicion of assault.Attorney General of Israel Gali Baharav-Miara and Amit Aisman, the head of the State Attorney, approved the investigation, meaning that Kroizer will not be given parliamentary immunity. He is expected to be questioned on 18 October by members of Lahav 433.

== Personal life ==
Kroizer is married, and has three children. He resides in Natur, a settlement in the Golan Heights.
