= Apostolos Athanassakis =

American academic

Apostolos Nikolaou Athanassakis (Greek: Απόστολος Αθανασάκης; born 1938 in the village of Astrochori, near Arta, Epirus region, Greece, died October 4, 2025 in Athens, Greece) was a Greek classical scholar, and the former Argyropoulos Chair in Hellenic Studies at the University of California, Santa Barbara (UCSB). Professor Athanassakis, or "Professor A," as he was often referred to by students, served as the faculty in residence in Manzanita Village. Athanassakis taught at UCSB for nearly 30 years in the Classics Department. From 1984 to 1986 he served as head of the Humanities Division at the University of Crete, in Greece. On October 4, 2025, Athanassakis died in Athens, Greece, aged 87 years old.

== Bibliography ==
- Apocolocyntosis divi Claudii (translation, introduction and commentary, 1973)
- The Homeric Hymns (translation, introduction and notes). Baltimore, MD; Johns Hopkins University Press, 1976. ISBN 0-8018-1792-7
- Vita Sancti Pachomii (translation and introduction, 1977)
- Hesiod: Theogony, Works and Days and Shield of Heracles (translation, introduction and commentary, 1983)
- Essays on Hesiod, Volume I (editor, 1992)
- Essays on Hesiod, Volume II (editor and contributor, 1993)
- Antony of Choziba, The Life of Saint George of Choziba and the Miracles of the Most Holy Mother of God at Choziba (ed. with Tim Vivian, 1993)
- The Life of St. Anthony (with Tim Vivian, 2003)
- The Orphic Hymns: Text, Translation and Notes, Society of Biblical Literature, 1988

== Sources ==
- UCSB Department of Classics Bio
- UCSB 2002 Catalog Profile
