= Tim Vivian =

American scholar of early Christianity

- Born: 1951 (age 74–75)

Academic background
- Education: Church Divinity School of the Pacific (M.Div.)
- Alma mater: University of California, Santa Barbara (PhD)
- Thesis: Saint Peter of Alexandria: Bishop and Martyr (1985)
- Doctoral advisor: Birger A. Pearson

Academic work
- Institutions: California State University, Bakersfield
- Main interests: Early Christianity, Coptic Christianity, Desert Fathers

Tim Vivian (born 1951) is an American scholar of early Christianity and Coptologist. He is Professor Emeritus of Religious Studies at California State University, Bakersfield (or CSUB), and a retired priest of the Episcopal Church (United States).

== Education and career ==
Vivian received a Bachelor of Arts in English from the University of California, Santa Barbara, a Master of Arts in American literature from California Polytechnic State University (San Luis Obispo), and a Master of Arts in comparative literature from the University of California, Santa Barbara. He then earned an interdisciplinary Doctor of Philosophy degree in classics, history, and religious studies from the University of California, Santa Barbara with a doctoral dissertation titled Saint Peter of Alexandria: Bishop and Martyr in 1985 under the direction of Birger A. Pearson. He next earned an M.Div. from the Church Divinity School of the Pacific and went on to do research from 1988 to 1990 as a Henry R. Luce Post-Doctoral Fellow at Yale Divinity School.

Vivian taught at CSUB from 1990 to 2022. He has published over 25 books, 50 journal articles, and 100 scholarly book reviews. He won the Faculty Scholarship & Creative Activity award at California State University, Bakersfield, in 2007/2008. He serves on the board of advisors for Cistercian Studies Quarterly and on the editorial board of Coptica.

Vivian is a priest of the Episcopal Church. He served as vicar of Grace/St. Paul's from 2007 to 2017. On April 26, 2018, Vivian was granted professor emeritus status at California State University, Bakersfield. On October 11, 2018, he was awarded an honorary Doctor of Divinity degree from the Church Divinity School of the Pacific for his scholarship and work for social justice.

== Research ==
Although Vivian's research emphasis is on early Christianity, especially Coptic studies and early Christian monasticism, he has published broadly in religious history. He is the recipient of the 2015 Nelson R. Burr Prize of the Historical Society of the Episcopal Church (HSEC) for his article “Wake the Devil from His Dream: Thomas Dudley, Quincy Ewing, Religion, and the ‘Race Problem’ in the Jim Crow South” published in the December 2014 issue of Anglican and Episcopal History.

Vivian is also a published poet with published collections including Other Voices, Other Rooms (Eugene, OR: Wipf and Stock, 2020), Poems Written in a Time of Plague: Further Reflections on Scripture (Eugene, OR: Wipf and Stock, 2020), and A Doorway into Thanks: Further Reflections on Scripture (New York: Austin Macauley, 2023).

== Selected publications ==
- Saint Peter of Alexandria: Bishop and Martyr (Minneapolis: Fortress Press, 1988).
- Paphnutius: Histories of the Monks of Upper Egypt and the Life of Onnophrius (Kalamazoo: Cistercian Publications, 1993).
- Two Coptic Homilies Attributed to Saint Peter of Alexandria (with Birger A. Pearson) (Rome: Opus dei Copti manoscritti litterari, 1993).
- The Life of Saint George of Choziba and The Miracles of the Most Holy Mother of God at Choziba (with Apostolos Athanassakis) (San Francisco: International Scholars Publications, 1994). Edition of Antony of Choziba's biography of George of Choziba.
- Journeying into God: Seven Early Monastic Lives (Minneapolis: Fortress Press, 1996). (Contains the lives of Anthony the Great, Pambo, Syncletica of Palestine, George of Choziba, Abba Aaron, Theognius of Jerusalem, and Onnophrius)
- The Lives of the Jura Fathers (with Kim Vivian & Jeffrey Burton Russell) (Kalamazoo: Cistercian Publications, 2000).
- The Life of Antony (with Apostolos Athanassakis) (Kalamazoo: Cistercian Publications, 2003).
- Four Desert Fathers: Pambo, Evagrius, Macarius of Egypt, and Macarius of Alexandria. Coptic Texts Relating to the Lausiac History of Palladius (Crestwood, NY: St. Vladimir's Seminary Press, 2004).
- Saint Macarius the Spiritbearer: Coptic Texts Relating to Saint Macarius the Great (Crestwood, NY: St. Vladimir's Seminary Press, 2004).
- Words to Live By: Journeys in Ancient and Modern Monasticism (Kalamazoo: Cistercian Publications, 2005).
- Witness to Holiness: Abba Daniel of Scetis (with numerous scholars) (Kalamazoo: Cistercian Publications, 2008).
- Becoming Fire: Through the Year with the Desert Fathers and Mothers (Collegeville, MN: Cistercian Publications/Liturgical Press, 2009).
- Mark the Monk: Counsels on the Spiritual Life, Volumes I & 2 (with Augustine Casiday) (Crestwood, NY: St. Vladimir's Seminary Press, 2009).
- The Holy Workshop of Virtue: The Life of Saint John the Little (with Maged S. A. Mikhail) (Collegeville, MN: Cistercian Publications/Liturgical Press, 2010).
- "Syncletica," in Daniel Patte, ed., The Cambridge Dictionary of Christianity (Cambridge: Cambridge UP, 2010), 2012.
- Eight articles in The Oxford Dictionary of Late Antiquity (Oxford: Oxford University Press, 2018).
- The Sayings and Stories of the Desert Fathers and Mothers, Volumes 1 and 2 (Collegeville, MN: Cistercian Publications, 2021, 2023).
- Door of the Wilderness: The Greek, Coptic, and Copto-Arabic Sayings of St. Antony of Egypt (with Lisa Agaiby) (Leiden: Brill, 2021).
- The Life of Bishoi: Translations of the Greek, Syriac, Ethiopic, and Arabic Texts (ed. with Maged S. A. Mikhail) (Cairo, Egypt: The American University in Cairo Press, 2022).
- "“The Origins of Monasticism," in The T&T Clark Handbook of the Early Church (London: T&T Clark, 2022), 483–500.
- Exhortation to the Monks by Hyperechios (The American University in Cairo Press, 2024).
- Becoming Fire: Through the Year with the Desert Fathers and Mothers, rev. ed. (Cistercian Publications, 2024).
- "The Desert Fathers and Mothers and the Ascetical Tradition," in The Oxford Handbook of Orthodox Theology (2025).
- Chapters on the Coptic and two Greek Lives in The Lives of Paul of Thebes (Brill, 2025).
- Neilos of Ancyra: Three Works (The American University in Cairo Press, 2025-2026).
