= Hasmonean and Herodian royal winter palaces =

Hasmonean and Herodian royal winter palaces (Tulul Abu el-'Alayiq)
- Interactive map of Hasmonean and Herodian royal winter palaces (Tulul Abu el-'Alayiq)
- 31.8537083°N 35.4337333°E
- Type: Royal estate and palace complex
- Periods: Hellenistic, Early Roman, Early Islamic
- Cultures: Hasmonean, Herodian, Umayyad/Abbasid
- Location: Jericho Governorate, West Bank, Palestine
- Region: Jordan Valley

Site notes
- Excavation dates: 1868; 1909–1911; 1950–1951; 1973–1987; 1998–2000
- Archaeologists: Charles Warren, Ernst Sellin, Carl Watzinger, James L. Kelso, Dimitri Baramki, James B. Pritchard, Ehud Netzer

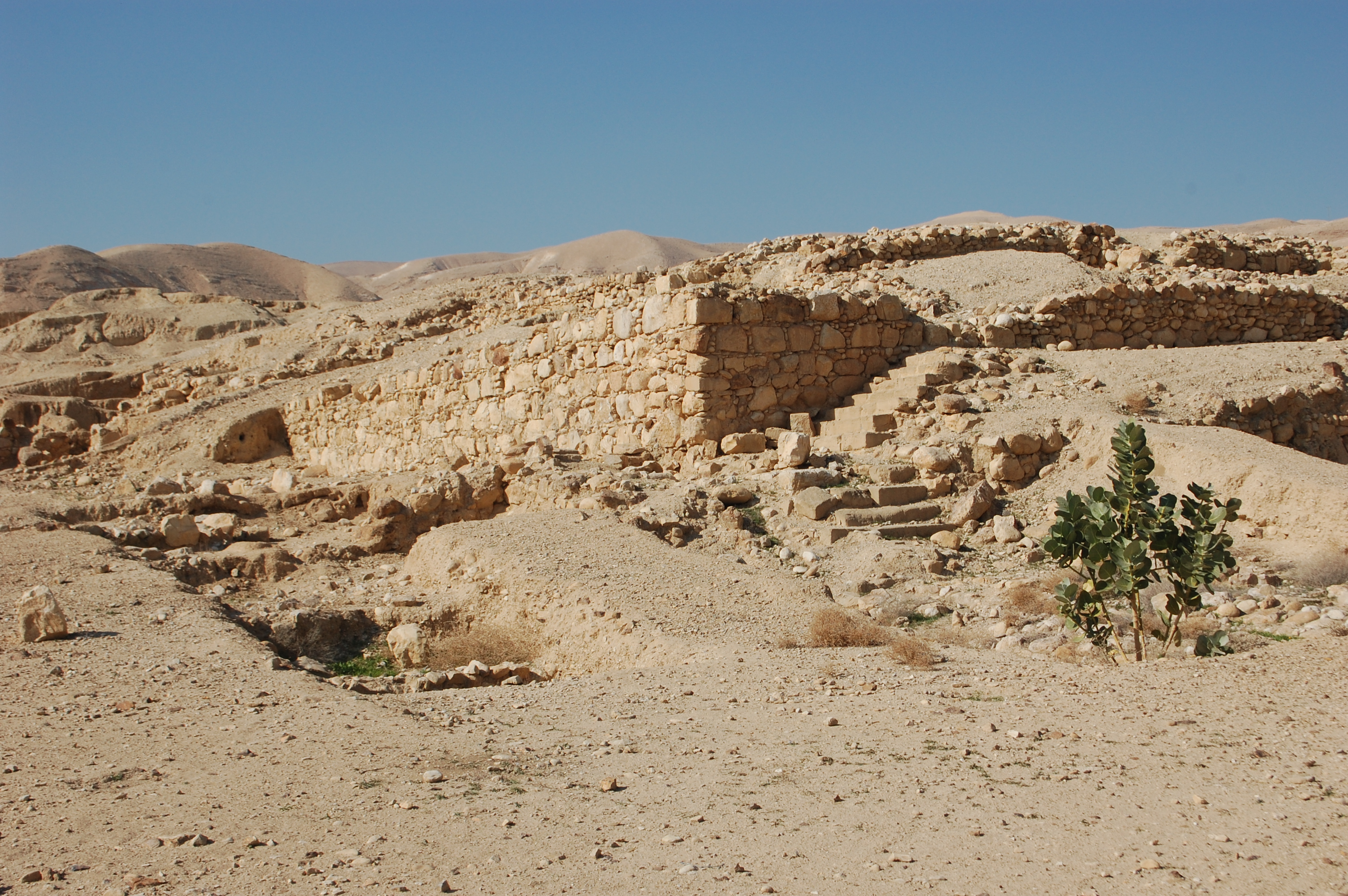
Hasmonean royal winter palace

The Hasmonean and Herodian royal winter palaces, or the Hasmonean and Herodian palaces at Jericho (locally known as Tulul Abu el-'Alayiq), are a complex of Hasmonean and Herodian buildings from the late Hellenistic period and early Roman periods (the Second Temple period in Jewish historiography), which were discovered in the western plain of Jericho valley, in the Jericho Governorate of the West Bank, Palestine. The site lies on two mounds (tulul) on either side of Wadi Qelt, at the point where the wadi and the ancient road from Jerusalem reach the Jordan Valley plain.

The palaces are evidence of the luxurious lifestyle of the Hasmonean dynasty and Herod the Great. They made extensive use of swimming pools, bathhouses, ornamental gardens and orchards. The palaces were not far from Jerusalem – 20 km along the ancient Roman road (see "ascent of Adummim"). Excavators have also recorded earlier remains from the Chalcolithic and Early Bronze Age and later occupation into the Early Islamic period, including an 8th–9th-century fortress on the southern mound. In January 2026 the State of Palestine added the site to its UNESCO World Heritage Tentative List as the "Archaeological Palaces of Tulul Abu el-'Alayiq".

== History of excavations ==
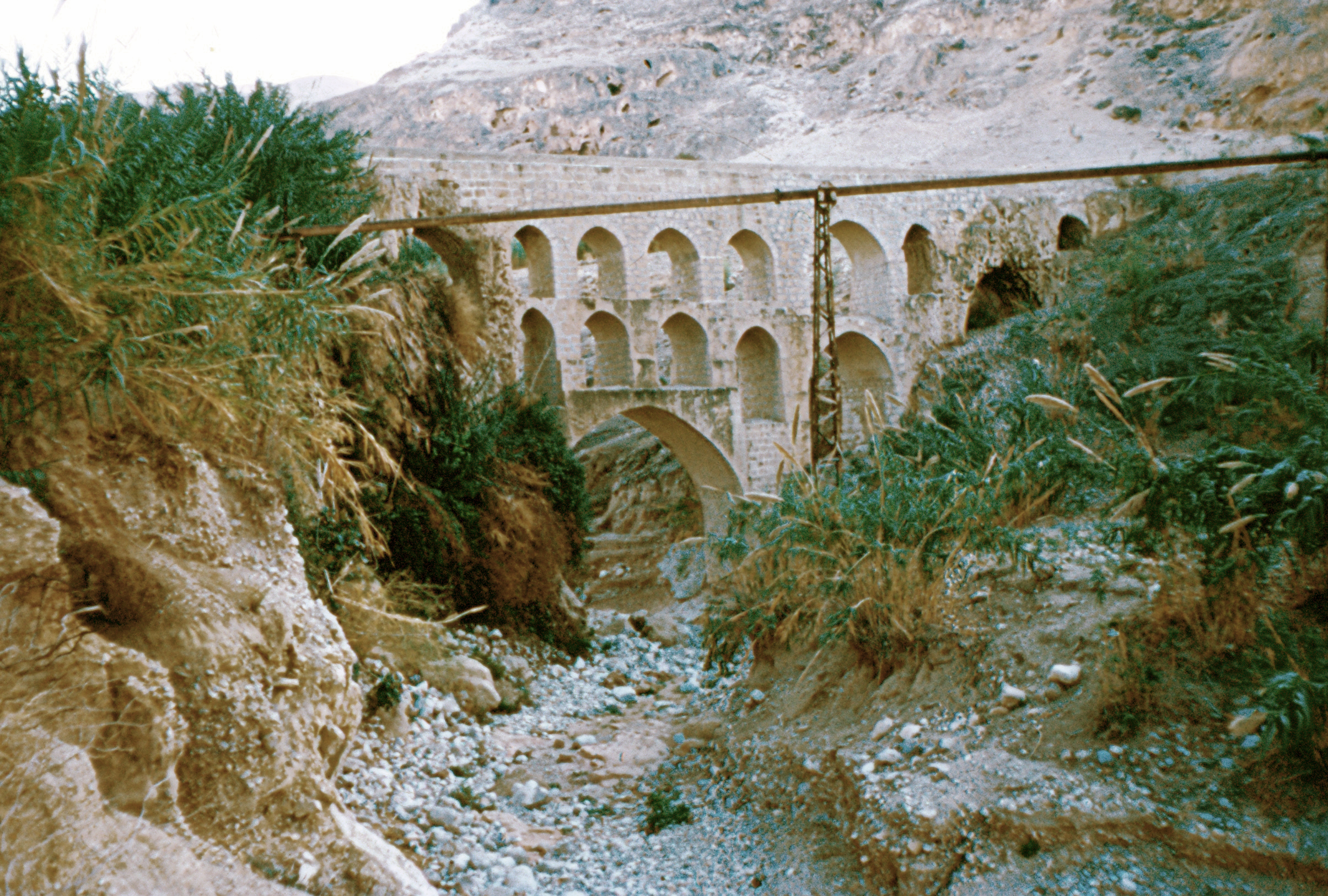
Roman aqueduct at Ein Duq near Jericho

The site was excavated in the 19th century by Charles Warren, who attempted to locate the place of Biblical Jericho. After making an archaeological trench, he concluded that this site is from the Roman period. Additional excavations were conducted by the Germans Ernst Sellin and Carl Watzinger, in 1910–1911, but the results have never been published.

Under Jordanian administration of the West Bank, a joint expedition of the American Schools of Oriental Research and the Pittsburgh-Xenia Theological Seminary excavated in 1950 under James L. Kelso and the Palestinian archaeologist Dimitri Baramki, formerly of the Mandate Department of Antiquities and the excavator of Khirbat al-Mafjar. Baramki organised the work at Tulul Abu el-'Alayiq; the expedition uncovered the "sunken garden" north of the southern mound and the Early Islamic fortress on its summit. A second American season in 1951, directed by A. H. Detweiler and then by F. V. Winnett and James B. Pritchard, cleared the large building later identified as Herod's first palace.

After the Yom Kippur War in 1973, extensive excavations were conducted on site by archaeologist Ehud Netzer. The excavations continued for ten seasons and covered an area of 30 hectares. The excavations also revealed remains of aqueducts to the west of Jericho. At the oasis of Jericho, Netzer uncovered new wings of Herod's winter palace, as well as a Hasmonean (Maccabean) winter palace containing a number of swimming pools and gardens. The complex includes what Netzer identified as a synagogue, built 70–50 BC and as such one of the oldest synagogues ever found. The identification of the building as a synagogue is controversial.

== Location and site description ==
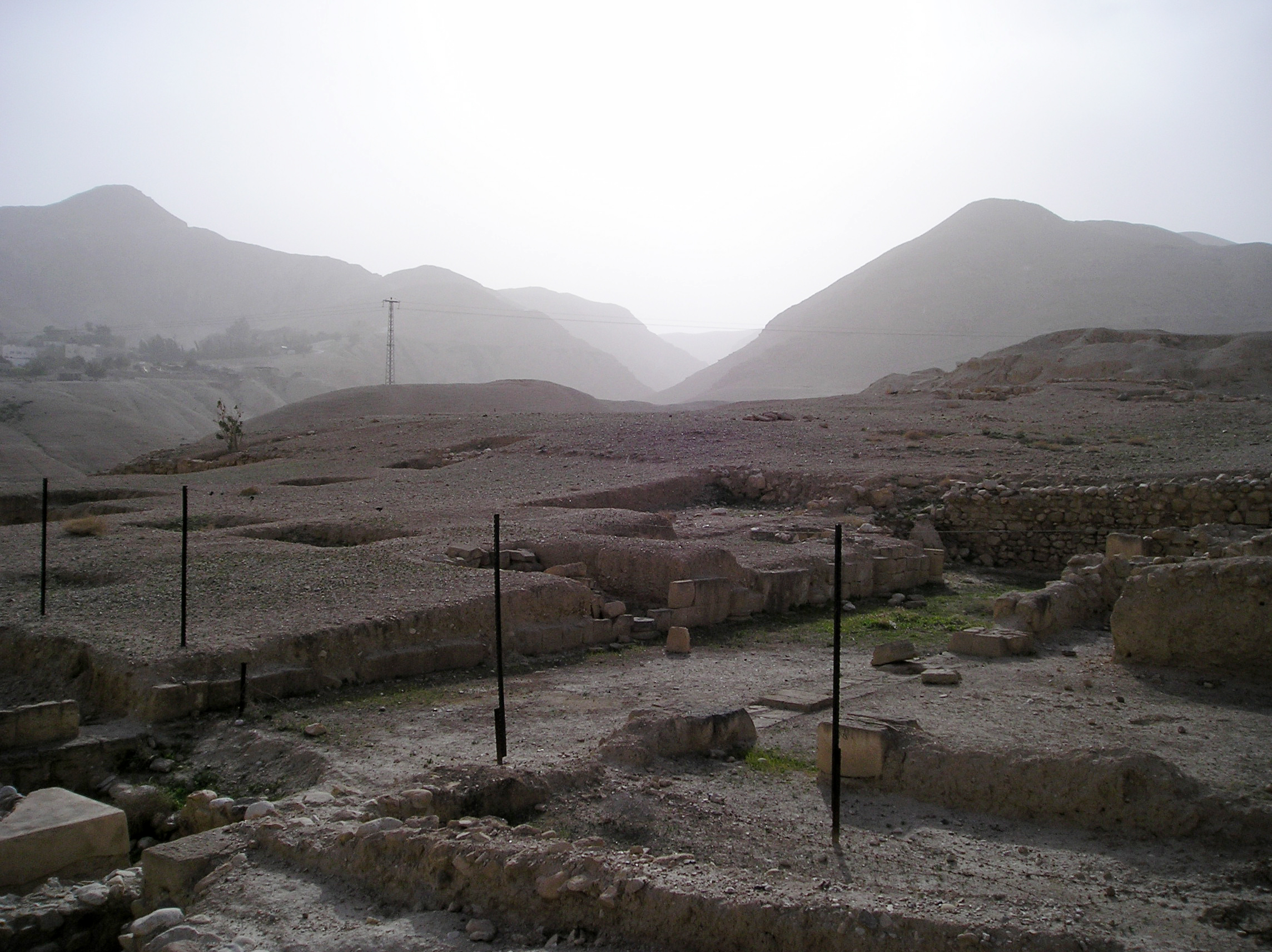
Excavation site

Tulul Abu el-'Alayiq ("the mounds of Abu el-'Alayiq") lies about 2 km southwest of the modern city of Jericho, on the western edge of the Jericho oasis, where Wadi Qelt leaves the eastern slopes of the Judaean Desert and opens onto the Jordan Valley plain, roughly 250 m below sea level. The ancient road from Jerusalem descended to the plain at the same point. The site takes its name from two artificial mounds on either side of the wadi: a southern mound (mound 1) and a northern mound (mound 2).

The site is one part of a wider archaeological landscape in the oasis. That landscape also includes Tell es-Sultan (ancient Jericho, inscribed as a UNESCO World Heritage Site in 2023), the Byzantine and Early Islamic settlement at Tell Hassan, and the Umayyad palace of Khirbat al-Mafjar (Hisham's Palace) north of the city. According to the UNESCO nomination for Tell es-Sultan, the main focus of settlement in the oasis moved from the spring of 'Ein es-Sultan to Tulul Abu el-'Alayiq in the Hellenistic period, and later to Tell Hassan in the Byzantine and Early Islamic periods. In antiquity the site was therefore known as the Jericho of the Hellenistic and Roman periods, often called "Herodian" or "New Testament Jericho".

=== Layout ===
The remains form a single royal estate rather than a walled town. Successive palaces stand at its centre, with gardens, pools, residential quarters, service buildings and farmland around them. The estate has four main components:

- Hasmonean palace complex (north of Wadi Qelt): a fortified central building, a pool complex with a pavilion, and the "twin palaces" to the south. It was later partly buried beneath an artificial mound.
- Herodian palaces: the first palace on the south bank, the second palace built over the Hasmonean complex, and the third palace on both banks, linked by a bridge across the wadi. According to the UNESCO submission, Herod's building increased the built-up area of the estate from about 3 to about 25 acres.
- Residential and service quarters: a row of houses east of the Hasmonean palace, probably occupied by estate officials, together with a contested pillared hall interpreted as a synagogue (see below). Remains of further large residential buildings of the period extend south of the palaces into the area of today's Aqabat Jabr refugee camp.
- Agricultural and industrial zone: fields, irrigation channels, a large press for wine and date honey, and workshops where the estate's dates and balsam were processed.

=== Periods of occupation ===
Excavations have documented occupation from the Chalcolithic and Early Bronze Age to the Early Islamic period. The main phases are:

- Chalcolithic and Early Bronze Age: scattered early remains, which predate the estate by several thousand years.
- Hellenistic, pre-Hasmonean (2nd century BCE): a stone structure on the southern mound and remains on the northern mound, which the 1950 excavators identified as towers. They linked them to the Seleucid fortifications of Bacchides and to the forts of Threx and Taurus.
- Hasmonean (late 2nd century – 31 BCE): founding of the royal estate and its aqueducts. A palace was built under John Hyrcanus I and enlarged under Alexander Jannaeus and Salome Alexandra. An earthquake in 31 BCE ended this phase.
- Herodian (c. 35 BCE – 4 BCE): Herod built three palaces in succession, the last using Roman construction methods.
- Post-Herodian and Roman (4 BCE – 3rd century CE): the palace was burned after Herod's death and rebuilt by Archelaus, and the estate continued under Roman rule. The complex was then largely abandoned, apart from what the 1950s excavators interpreted as a guard post of the 2nd–3rd centuries on the northern mound.
- Early Islamic (8th–9th centuries): an oval fortress on top of the southern mound, and limited reuse of the building cleared in 1951.

=== Water system ===
The estate depended on irrigation, because the plain receives only about 140 mm of rain a year. The Hasmoneans built two long aqueducts, which brought water from perennial springs to a site far from 'Ein es-Sultan, the spring that had supplied earlier Jericho. The aqueducts carried water from:

- the springs of Wadi Qelt: 'Ein Fara ('Ein Prat), 'Ein Fawwar ('Ein Mabua) and 'Ein Qelt;
- the springs of Wadi Nu'eima (Nahal Na'aran): 'Ein Nu'eima, 'Ein ad-Duyuk ('Ein Duk) and 'Ein Shusha.

Surveys have recorded five aqueducts in all, which distributed water across the estate and the valley. Inside the palaces, buried clay and lead pipes fed swimming pools, bathhouses, ritual baths and gardens. According to the UNESCO submission, this integration of architecture, water and landscape is one of the site's defining features.

=== Types of finds ===
- Architecture and building techniques: mudbrick walls on fieldstone foundations, plastered and painted. The third palace adds opus reticulatum and opus quadratum masonry in Roman concrete, and a bridge across the wadi.
- Wall and floor decoration: frescoes painted to imitate marble and stucco modelled as ashlar masonry in the Hasmonean rooms. The Herodian halls have mosaic floors, painted stucco and Corinthian columns.
- Water installations: swimming pools, Greek- and Roman-style bathhouses with hypocaust heating and a circular laconicum, numerous ritual baths (mikva'ot), and an ornamental "sunken garden" with a niched façade.
- Agricultural and industrial installations: a large press, workshops and storerooms connected with the production of dates, wine and balsam. Balsam resin was one of the most valuable commodities of the Roman world.
- Pottery, glass and small finds: large assemblages of Hellenistic and Roman pottery, glass and stone vessels. They include 122 pear-shaped unguentaria for oils or perfumes found in the building cleared in 1951, and a Roman amphora with a stamped handle found by Warren in 1868. The pottery is published in volume III of the final reports.
- Coins: Hasmonean and Herodian coins, among them a hoard showing that the palace was still used by Antigonus II Mattathias (40–37 BCE). The excavation also recovered 266 Early Islamic coins, mostly Umayyad with some Abbasid issues, many minted in Syria and Egypt.
- Inscriptions: a marble slab from the Early Islamic fortress inscribed with passages from the Qur'an, dated to the late 8th century.

== Hasmonean palace ==
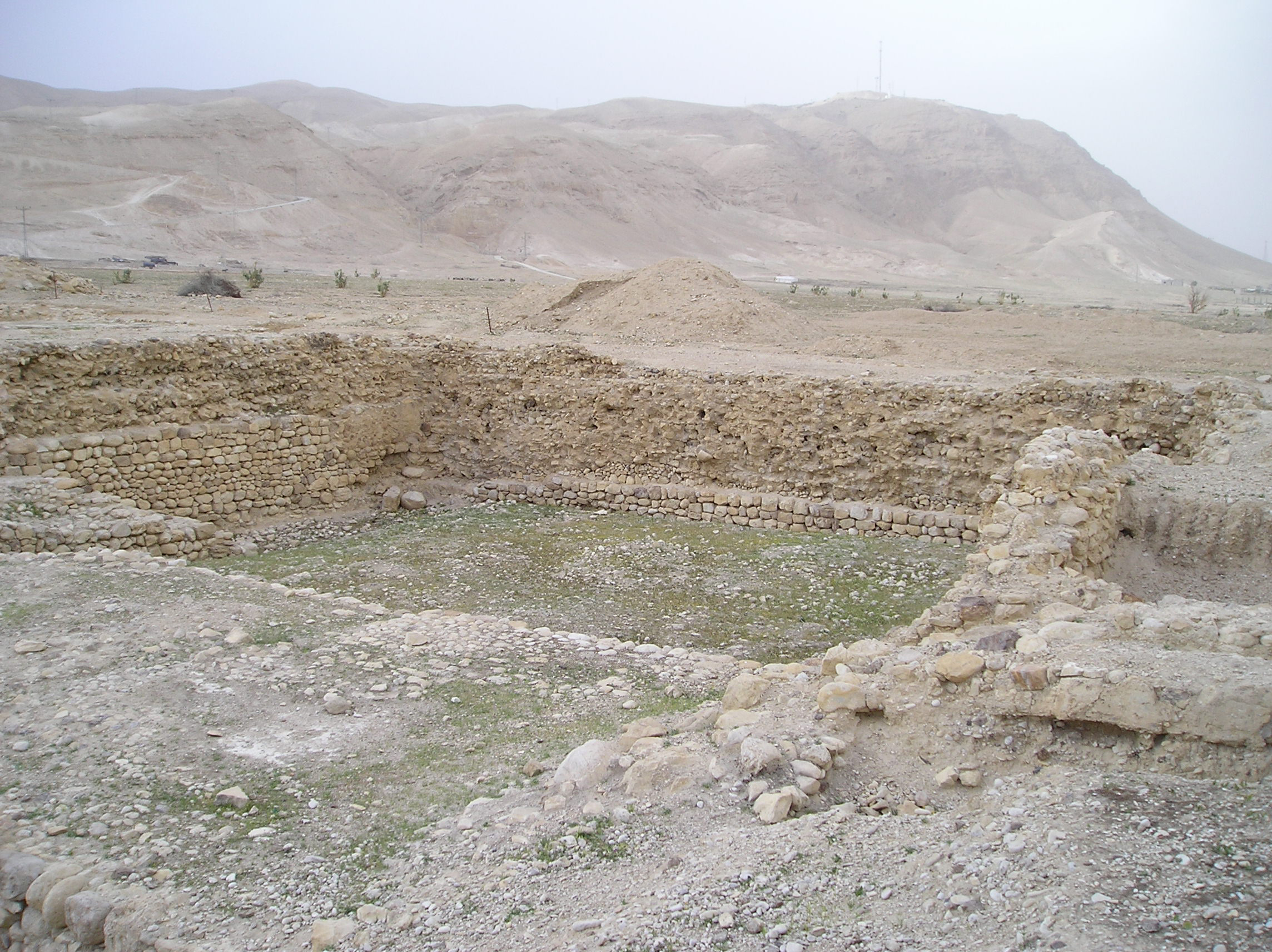
Swimming pool of Alexander Jannaeus

The Hasmonean winter palace, at the northern part of the site, consisted of the following structures:

- The main building
- Swimming pool complex
- Southern division ("twin palaces")

The Hasmonean palace was built on a hill overlooking the city of Jericho. The palace was built by John Hyrcanus I (134–104 BCE) and believed to have been fortified during the reign of Alexander Jannaeus (103–76 BCE).

A strong earthquake in 31 BCE destroyed the palace. Evidence to this was found in different parts of the complex. On its site King Herod built an artificial tell, or mound, on which he built his second palace. The establishment of the mound resulted in coverage of the Hasmonean palace, and thus parts of it were preserved, such as a building wall remaining 7 metres high.

The main structure of the Hasmonean palace was 50 by 50 metres. Elements of the building were as was customary for luxury palaces in the area:

- Rooms were decorated with colorful frescoes, imitating marble.
- Stucco decorations in the form of building stones.
- An unroofed central courtyard.
- The water flowed into the swimming pools and buildings through clay and lead pipes, buried in the ground, and aqueducts supplied water to gardens and orchards.

Remains were found of two pairs of swimming pools: a small pair west of the palace, and a large pair north of it. It is speculated that the pools were the focus of entertainment and enjoyment of the inhabitants of the palace. Perhaps they are also the place where, according to historian Josephus, Aristobulus III (53–36 BC), the last high priest from the Hasmonean dynasty, was drowned. South of the large pools was a luxurious 21 by 17 metres building, the so-called pavilion, built in the style of a Doric temple. An axis of symmetry passed through the pools, the open courtyard, and the temple north of them.

The "twin palaces" were two surprisingly similar buildings. The hypothesis is that they were built by Queen Shlomtzion (ruled 76-67 BCE) for her two sons, Hyrcanus and Aristobulus, in order to soften the rivalry between them that lasted nearly thirty years. The size of the palaces was 25 by 25 metres. Each of the two palaces contained a luxurious bathhouse.

Many ritual baths were found around the palace, required by their priestly owners, who had to be ritually purified before eating terumah. A ritual bath for vessels was also found, containing the remains of 800 bowls. The palace also served the last Hasmonean king, Antigonus Matityahu II (r. 40–37 BCE), as evidenced by a hoard of 20 coins.

== Herod's first palace ==
The first palace was situated on the southern bank of Wadi Qelt, on land leased from Cleopatra, Queen of Egypt, who received it as a gift from Mark Antony in 36 BCE. Meanwhile, in the north, the Hasmonean palace was still standing. The palace was a rectangular building, 86 by 46 meters. In the center was an open courtyard with perimeter columns and a central pool draining the rainwater. In the palace were a magnificent hall, a luxurious bathhouse, and a pair of deep pools, which were apparently ritual baths.

The palace was exposed in 1951 by Pritchard, who thought it was a gymnasium. After excavation of the palace, it was covered over with sand.

== Herod's second palace ==
The second palace was built in 31 BCE. Herod won the trust of Emperor Augustus and in return received the Jericho area he had previously lost to the by then defunct Queen Cleopatra. After the earthquake of 31 BCE Herod decided to build a second palace on the ruins of the Hasmonean palace. He combined the pools of the Hasmonean palace into one large pool, 32 by 18 meters. The second palace (north of Wadi Qelt), along with the first palace (south of Wadi Qelt), served Herod for residential and ceremonial purposes.

A unique feature of the second palace was its residential wing, which contained a designated recreation area. The villa was built on an artificial tell covering the Hasmonean palace: 35 by 43 meters tall, eight meters above the surroundings, providing a view of the estate's orchards and the surroundings. The second palace was full of gardens. In the pleasure wing were the big pool and a bathhouse, which has been well preserved.

== Herod's third palace ==
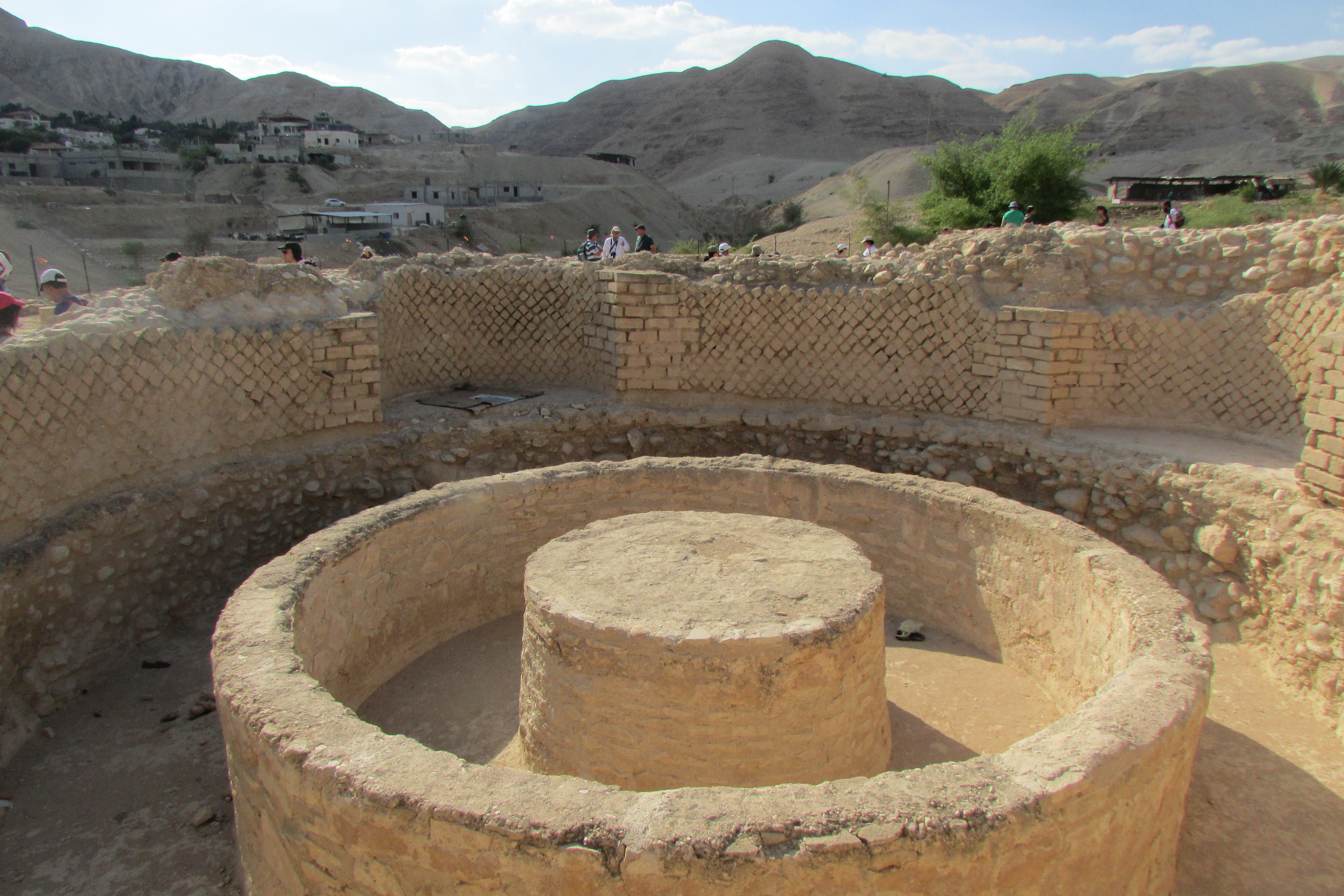
Bath from Herod's third palace

The third palace was the most magnificent of the palaces. It was established on both sides of Wadi Qelt. Ehud Netzer, the editor of excavations at the site, believe that palace residents could see water flowing in the riverbed for up to two months a year, letting the viewers feel like they were on the edge of an actual river. The builders, who apparently were from Italy, used construction methods that were common in their homeland such as:

- Opus reticulatum – small stones, 10 cm by 10 cm, placed in diagonal rows. In Jericho they were anointed with white or colored plaster
- Opus Koodroas – rectangular stones

Local mud bricks were also layered on top of stone construction. After being covered with plaster, there was no difference between them and the models from Italy.

The third palace of Herod, in the center of the site, included the following buildings:

- The north wing
- Sunken garden
- The southern mound
- Big pool

== The "synagogue" ==
East of the palace, Netzer excavated a pillared hall with benches, a niche and an adjoining ritual bath, which he identified as a synagogue built c. 70–50 BCE, making it one of the oldest synagogues known. The identification is disputed: Zvi Uri Ma'oz argued that no synagogue existed there, and Stacey proposed that the hall served mainly as the estate's administrative office.

== Industrial area ==
The industrial area was next to residential buildings and service buildings.

== Royal estate ==
In the estate a huge wine-press was found, which was probably used for making wine and "date honey". Farm crops, according to literary sources, were: palm trees, persimmon resin, and sap, which produced perfumes and medicines. Some of them were sent overseas. It was an intelligent use of the warm climate of the place.

== Heritage status ==
On 13 January 2026 the Permanent Delegation of the State of Palestine to UNESCO submitted the "Archaeological Palaces of Tulul Abu el-'Alayiq" to the World Heritage Tentative List under criteria (ii), (iii) and (iv). The submission describes the site as a material record of cultural exchange between Hellenistic, Roman and local building traditions in ancient Palestine, emphasising its palatial and hydraulic landscape rather than its association with any single dynasty, and contrasts it with the fortified Herodian palaces at Masada and Herodium. Inclusion on a Tentative List is a preliminary step and does not imply a decision by the World Heritage Committee.

== See also ==
- Herodium
- Masada
- Jericho
- Tell es-Sultan
- Hisham's Palace
- Palazzo delle Colonne
