= Mitzpe Yeriho bus bombing =

1978 terrorist attack

1978 Mitzpe Yeriho bombing
- Location: 31.8190°N 35.3892°E; Mitzpe Yerawrhawehiho, West Bank
- Date: 19 November 1978
- Attack type: Bombing
- Deaths: 4
- Injuries: 37
- Perpetrators: DFLP and Fatah

On 19 November 1978 a bomb exploded in an intercity bus during a stopover at Mitzpe Yeriho in the West Bank. Four people were killed and 37 people were wounded in the attack.

== Attack ==
The bus that was attacked was an intercity bus scheduled to go from Shefech Zohar, a spa on the Dead Sea, to Tel Aviv via Jericho and Jerusalem. The bomb was reported by the bus driver to have been thrown into the crowded bus in Mitzpe Yeriho by a man who escaped in a waiting pick-up truck toward the Jordan River. The police investigation however found that inspection of the bus frame indicated that the bomb had been placed inside the bus rather than thrown.

Responsibility for the attack was claimed by Fatah and the Democratic Front for the Liberation of Palestine (DFLP). The victims were identified as Itzhak Grobard, an Israeli Kibbutznik from Ein Hachoresh; Charles Bilogora, 18, from Belgium, who worked as a volunteer in Ein Hachoresh; Shmaryahu Nechmad, a young Israeli army sergeant; and Aryeh Bentovim, 26, from Kibbutz Mitzpeh Shalom. Among those injured were three Canadians, two Americans and five Swedish women.

The attack was one of three terrorist incidents the same day, which was apparently timed to coincide with the first anniversary of Egyptian President Anwar Sadat's visit to Jerusalem, which launched the peace process between Israel and Egypt. The other attacks took place on the main street of Jaffa, in which two people were slightly injured and caused damage to nearby shops, and in downtown Jerusalem where an explosive charge was found and dismantled.

The attacks were condemned by the United States government, as State Department spokesman Hodding Carter said that the terrorist acts have "no justification" and that "we condemn those that perpetrated these attacks."

The attack was identified as the worst of 14 terror attacks against Israelis in six weeks, that led to the Israel Air Force attacking terrorist bases in South Lebanon in December a few weeks later.
