= Mitzpe Yeriho =

Israeli settlement in the West Bank

Mitzpe Yeriho: מִצְפֵּה יְרִחוֹ (Hebrew)
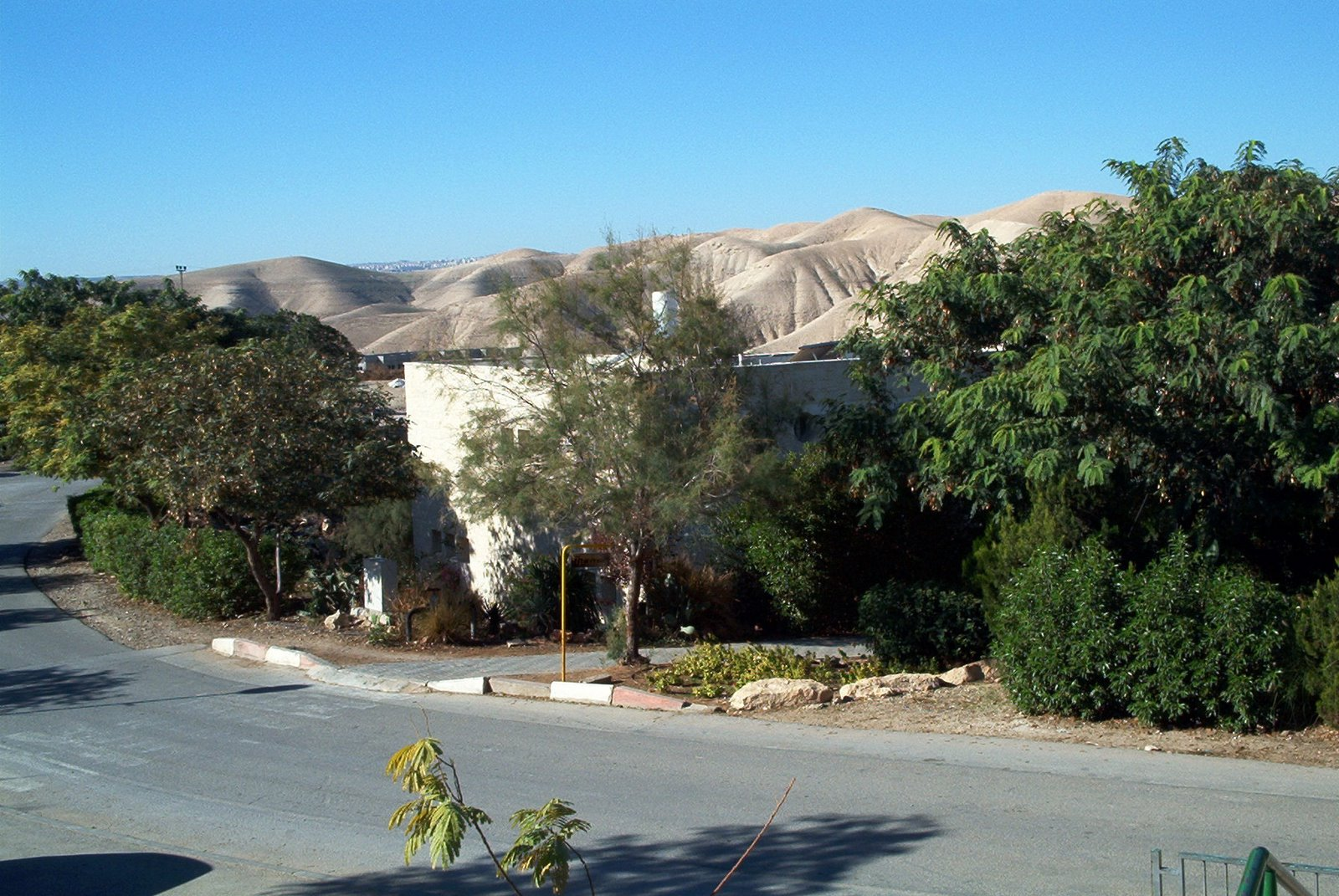
- Etymology: Jericho lookout
- Location within the Central West Bank
- Coordinates: 31°48′58″N 35°23′39″E
- Country: Palestine
- District: Judea and Samaria Area
- Council: Mateh Binyamin
- Region: West Bank
- Affiliation: Amana
- Founded: October 1977
- Population (2024): 2,867
- Website: Official website

Mitzpe Yeriho, also spelled Mitzpeh Yericho (Hebrew: מִצְפֵּה יְרִיחוֹ, lit. Jericho Lookout), is a religious Israeli settlement in the West Bank, located next to the Palestinian city of Jericho, from where it gets its name. Located 20 km east of Jerusalem and 10 km east of Ma'ale Adumim along Highway 1 in the Judean Desert, it is organised as a community settlement and falls under the jurisdiction of Mateh Binyamin Regional Council. In 2024 it had a population of 2,867.

The international community considers Israeli settlements in the West Bank illegal under international law, but the Israeli government disputes this.

== Geography ==
The village lies on one of the last cliffs marking the edge of the Judean highlands, and overlooks the Jordan Rift Valley, the Dead Sea, and the Palestinian city of Jericho, whence its name is derived. The climate is dry, with temperatures a few degrees warmer than Jerusalem temperatures all year round.

== History ==
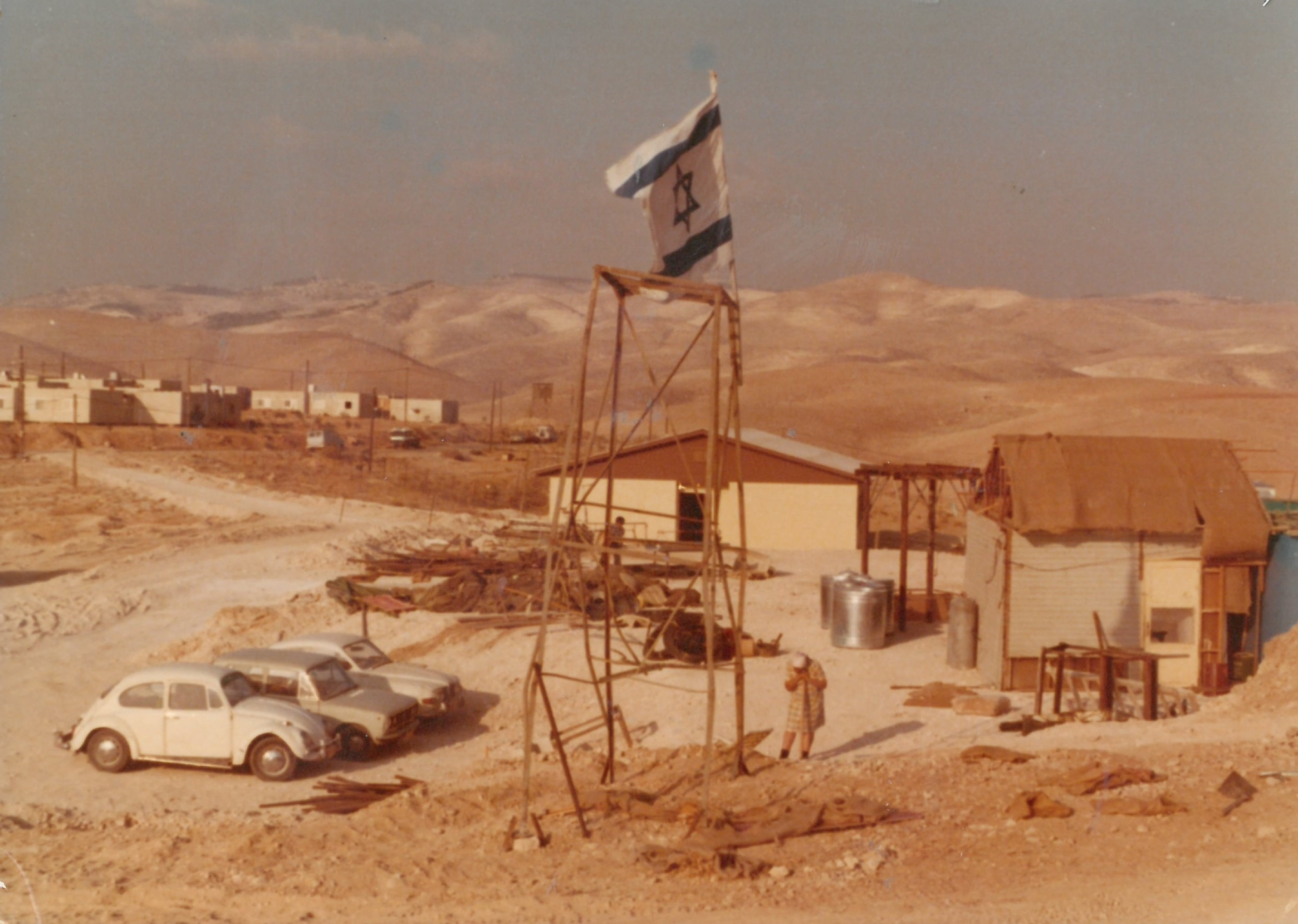
Original founding group in nearby Mishor Adumim, October 1977

Founded in October 1977 during the Jewish holiday of Sukkot, it was supposed to be located on government lands adjacent to Jericho. Due to the objection of then Defense Minister Ezer Weizman, they were moved to Mishor Adumim. Agriculture Minister Ariel Sharon suggested a few days later that they relocate to a hilltop overlooking Jericho, its current location.

According to ARIJ, in 1978 Israel confiscated 968 dunams of land from the Palestinian site of Nabi Musa in order to construct Mitzpe Yeriho. The same year, the settlement was the site of a Palestinian terrorist attack in which an intercity bus was bombed, killing four and wounding 37 people.

The original residents were a mixed group of both religiously observant and non-observant Jews. They later split up into two groups, and the non-observant members established a new settlement, Vered Yericho, located in the Jordan Valley below Mitzpe Yeriho and closer to Jericho. Still, Mitzpe Yeriho is a community of various traditions and observance levels. While the main synagogue follows Ashkenazi traditions, there are also two Sephardi synagogues, a Chabad synagogue, a Yemenite synagogue, a Carlebach minyan and several other small functioning minyanim.

In 1982, the community appointed then 27-year-old Yehuda Kroizer as community rabbi. Rabbi Kroizer gives regular classes, both in the town as well as in the Yeshivat HaRaayon HaYehudi, the former yeshiva of Rabbi Meir Kahane.

The yeshiva Netivot Yoseph, a leading Religious Zionist yeshiva headed by Rabbi Shabtai Sabbato, was founded in 1990, and moved the following year to Mitzpe Yeriho. The yeshiva is well known for its emphasis on breadth of Talmudic studies (bekiyut). It frequently honors students who have completed studying the entire Talmud; in 2011, there was a special celebration of 100 graduates who completed Shas. In 2018, the yeshiva opened a Beth Din, a rabbinical court for questions of financial laws. Graduates of the yeshiva who have passed the rabbinate's dayanut exams will serve as judges.

In May 1997, the Israel Defense Forces dismantled two illegally placed mobile homes in Mitzpe Yeriho.

In 2018, the council of Mitzpe Yericho elected its first woman mayor, Aliza Pilichowski, an immigrant from the United States.

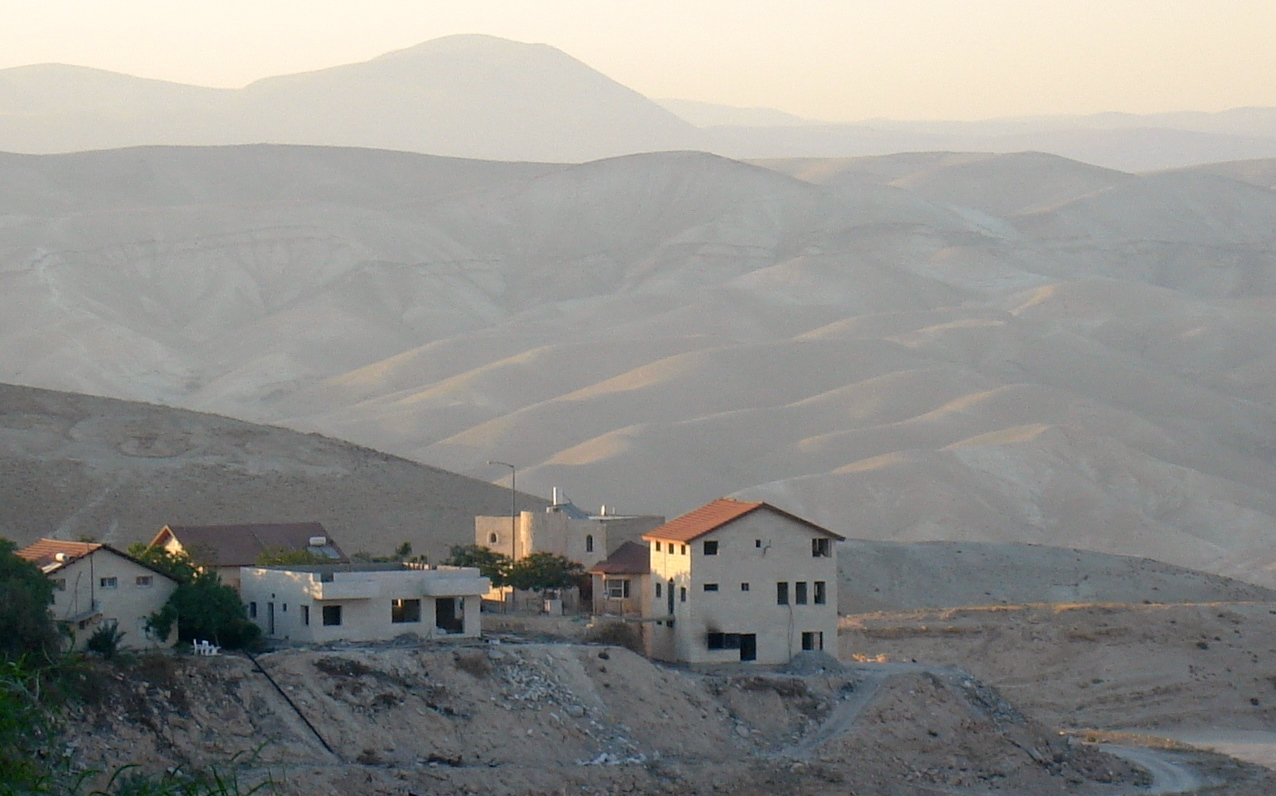
Mitzpe Yeriho in the Judean Desert (Mar. 2008)

== Demographics ==
In 2009, the population of Mitzpe Yeriho grew at an annual rate of 5.6%. As of 2010, over 450 families reside in Mitzpe Yeriho.

== Environment ==
In 1999, Mitzpe Yeriho was found to be a "radon-prone" area. Such an area is defined as one in which the radon concentration is more than 10 times the national average in more than one percent of the homes in the area.

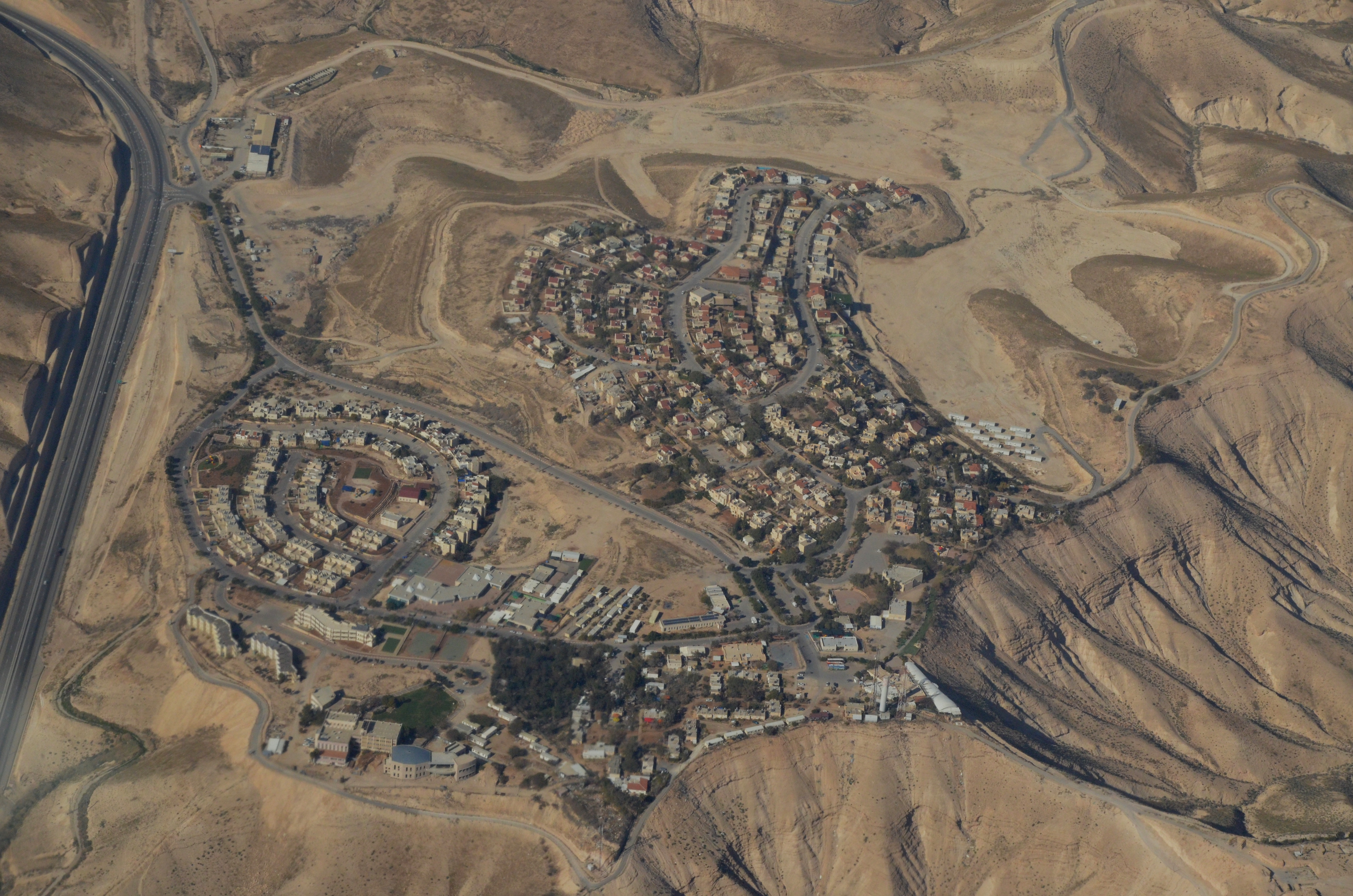
Aerial view of Mitzpe Yeriho, 2014

== Economy ==
The community is home to several businesses including an electronics facility, and also serves tourism in the nearby Wadi Qelt nature reserve and its Byzantine-era Saint George Monastery and Hasmonean-era Kypros fortress. It also hosts the Nof Harden wedding hall.

The community's views of the Jordan Valley and proximity to Jerusalem make it a popular vacation destination for Jerusalemites.
