= George of Choziba =

7th-century Greek Cypriot monk

Saint George of Choziba, also called George the Chozibite or Chozebite (died c. 625), was a Greek Cypriot monk and leader of the monastery of Choziba in the vicinity of Jerusalem. Today, the monastery is named after George.

George was born on Cyprus and orphaned at a young age. He was raised in a monastery under one of his uncles. His older brother joined the lavra of Calamon in the Jordan Valley, but George's request for admission was rejected and he was sent to the coenobium of Choziba, which had been founded around 480 by John of Thebes.

According to his biographer, George and his brother abstained from wine in the lavra of Calamon and in Choziba. From Saturday evening until Sunday afternoon, George would observe an all-night vigil in the coenobium of his monastery; otherwise he and his fellow monks lived in their cells. In 614, when the Persians invaded Palestine and sacked Jerusalem, George remained at Choziba.

A likeness of George is among the 36 saints (mostly local desert monks) painted on the plastered walls of a burial cave in the monastery of Mar Saba. He is identifiable by an inscription. He may be the latest saint depicted, and the archaeologist A. E. Mader suggested that the paintings date to between his death and the Arab conquest of Jerusalem in 638.

== Hagiography ==
A hagiography of George (BHG 669 and CPG 7985) was written by his disciple Antony of Choziba. It is a conventional hagiography but offers an eyewitness account of the Persian invasion of 614 and sheds important light on its impact on the Palestinian monasteries. It has been edited and translated into English:

- C. House, ed. "Vita Sancti Georgii Chozebitae Confessoris et Monachii". Analecta Bollandiana 7 (1888): 95–144, 336–359.
- T. Vivian and A. N. Athanassakis, trans. The Life of Saint George of Choziba and the Miracles of the Most Holy Mother of God at Choziba. San Francisco: International Scholars Publications, 1994.
- T. Vivian, trans. Journeying Into God. Seven Early Monastic Lives. Minneapolis: Fortress Press, 1996. pp. 71–105.
