= Adummim =

Place-name mentioned in the Bible

M17 U33 G17 G17
ꜣ(j)tꜣmm
in hieroglyphs
Era: New Kingdom
(1550–1069 BC)

Adummim (Hebrew: אֲדֻמִּים) is a place-name mentioned in the biblical Book of Joshua in connection with the ascent of Adummim.

== Location ==
Adummim was apparently on the road between Jerusalem and Jericho in the Judaean desert, today in the West Bank. It is mentioned in the Book of Joshua (15:7, 18:17) as being "on the south side of the stream", which Matthew Easton (1897) identified with Wadi Kelt, and across from Gilgal or/and Geliloth. Easton claimed that it was nearly halfway between Jerusalem and Jericho, and now bears the name of Tal'at ed-Dumm. More recently, Pekka Pitkänen (2010) has stated that "The location of Adummim is unclear."

The "ascent of Adummim" is a very important historical road that leads up from Jericho towards Jerusalem, following the top of a ridge that forms the southern bank of Wadi Qelt and separates it from Wadi Tal'at ad-Damm.

== Name ==
The name Adummim is related to אָדֹם adom, the Hebrew word for "red", and can be translated as "red places", which may refer to the reddish streaks found in the stone of the area. The red-brown hills of the area on the road descending from Jerusalem to Jericho are made of iron-oxide-tinged limestone. The Ascent of Adummim was known as the "Ascent of Blood" by the Crusaders.

== Sources outside the Bible ==
The name is attested in the Annals of Thutmose III at Temple of Karnak as Atamem, which Mariette, Rougé, Maspero, Müller, Borchardt and Budge identify with the biblical Adummim.

== In Christianity ==
It is supposed to have been the place referred to in the parable of the Good Samaritan. The so-called Inn of the Good Samaritan has been named based on this assumption.

== Archaeological sites ==
=== St George's Monastery (Wadi Qelt) ===
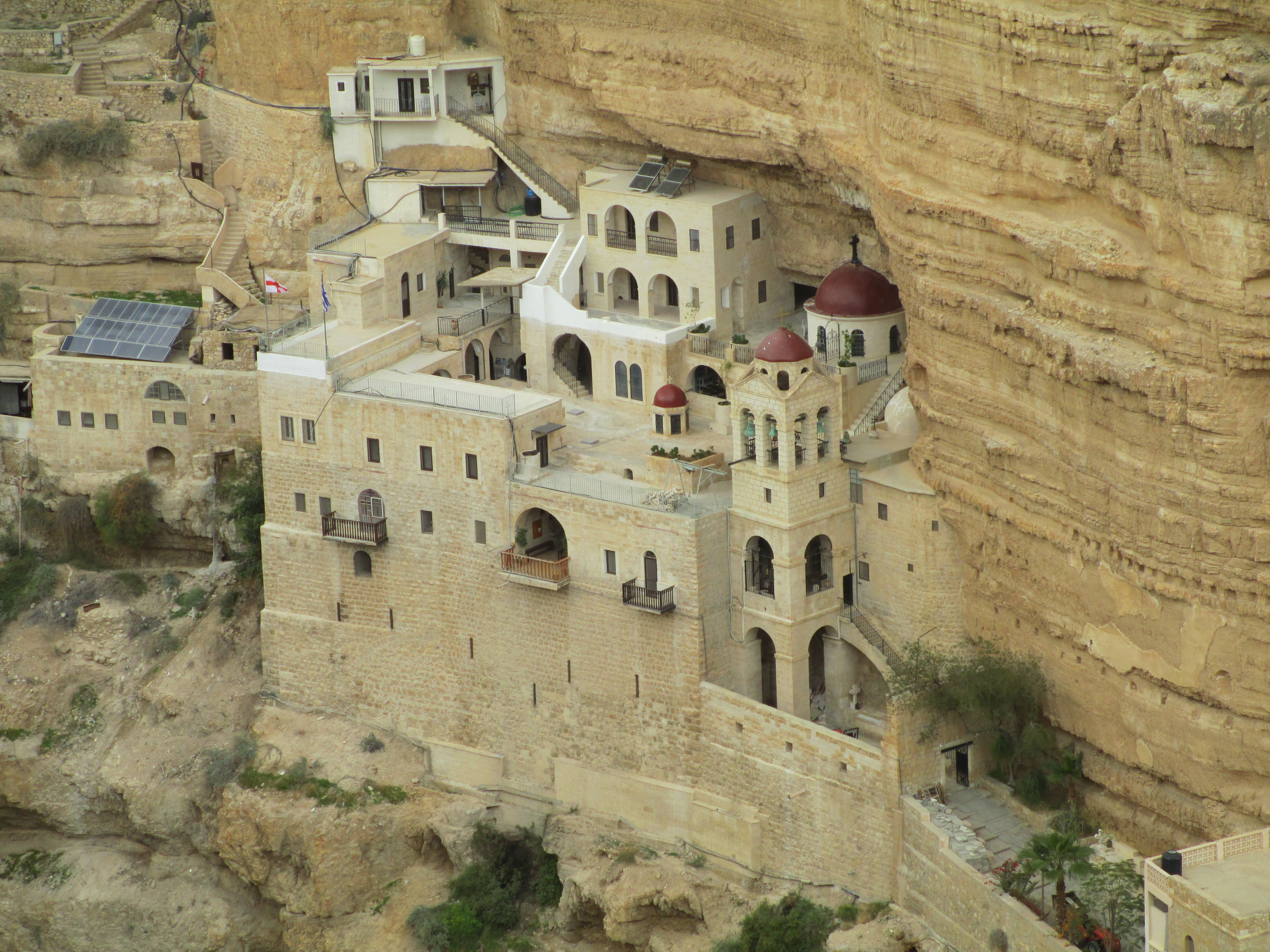
St George's Monastery on the southern side of Wadi Qelt

A lavra established in the 420s in Wadi Qelt and reorganised as a monastery around the year 500 became known as St George's Monastery. Rebuilt since the 19th century, it hangs spectacularly from the cliffs on the south side of the wadi, across from the ridge rising from the Plain of Jericho towards Jerusalem and known as the "ascent of Adummim".

=== Inn of the Good Samaritan (Khan al-Hatruri) ===
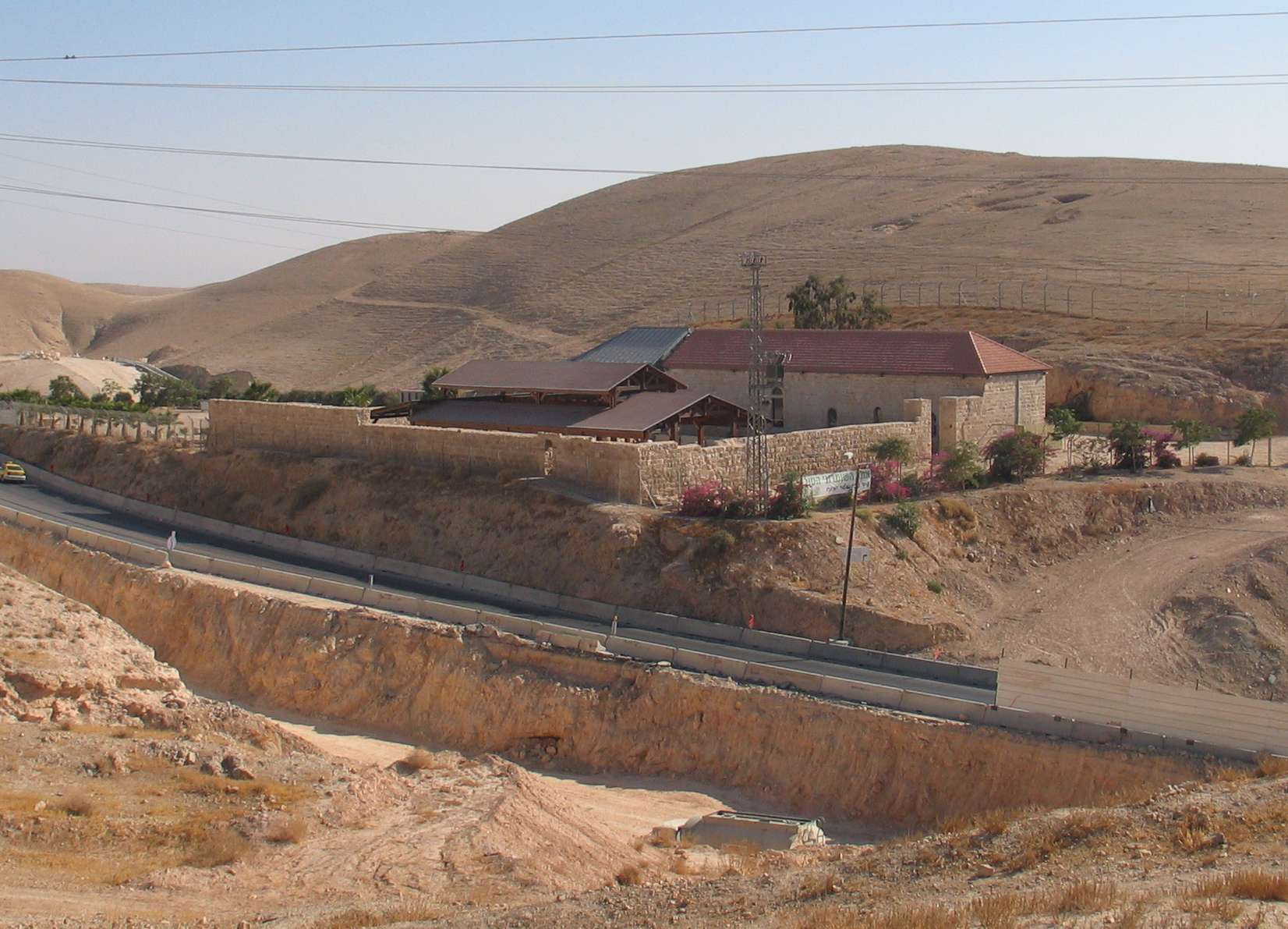
The Good Samaritan Inn (Khan al-Hatruri, seldom: Khan al-Ahmar)

Another khan built along the Ascent of Adummim, the Good Samaritan Inn, known in Arabic both as Khan al-Hatruri, and sometimes, quite confusingly (see the other khan mentioned above), as Khan al-Ahmar, stands 4 kilometres (2.5 mi) east of the Highway 1-Route 417 junction. Eusebius mentions the Late Roman fort of Maledomni, whose traces have disappeared under the Templar castle of Maldoim (see below). Under the protection of the fortified place, a caravanserai was established. In its present shape it was built in 1903.

In the Early Byzantine period, there seems to have been a fortress at the site (4th-5th century), replaced in the 6th century by a square-shaped hostel, erected around a central courtyard, providing Christian pilgrims with rooms, water from a central cistern, and a large church for worship.

The recently restored complex holds a museum of mosaics excavated by Israeli archaeologists in the Palestinian areas, and a wing dedicated to the history and customs of the Samaritans.

==== Templar castle of Maldoim ====
Across the modern highway from the Inn of the Good Samaritan/Khan al-Hatruri, are the archaeological remains of a medieval castle known to the Crusaders as Maldoim, Adumim, or Rouge Cisterne / Cisterna Rubea (Red Cistern), among other names. In Arabic it is known as Qal'at ad-Damm, "Blood Castle", and the hill it crowns as Tal'at ed-Dam, "hill of blood".

Maldoim was built by the Templars before 1169/72, probably at the site of a Late Roman fort, to protect the road between Jerusalem and Jericho. It stands at the top of the "Ascent of Blood", as the Ascent of Adummim was known to the Crusaders. The 2025 discovery of a mosaic under the castle floor suggests the presence of a Byzantine structure there.

=== Monastery of St Euthymius (Khan al-Ahmar) ===
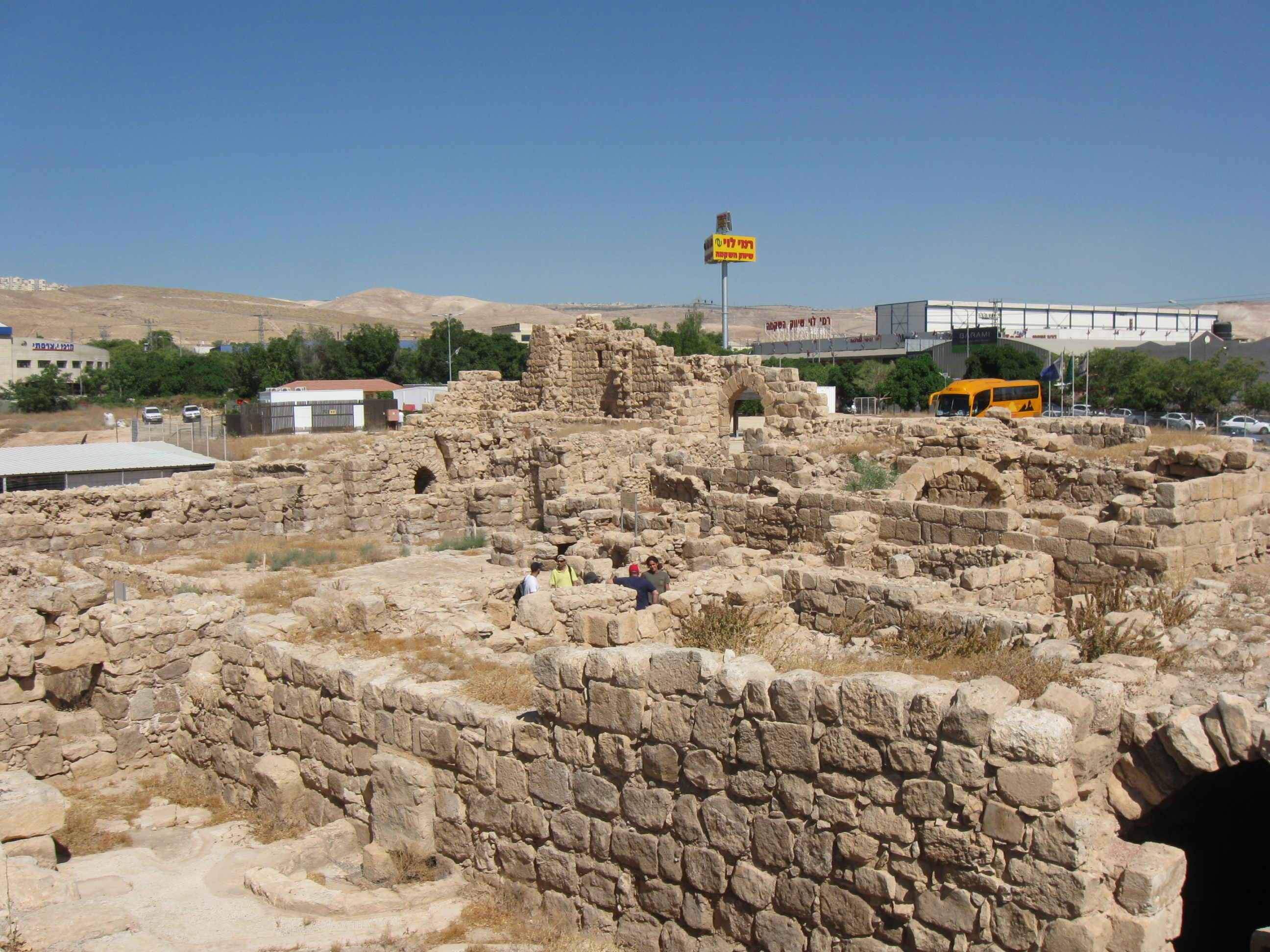
Lavra of St. Euthymius, later Khan al-Ahmar

The Byzantine Monastery of St. Euthymius, founded at first as a lavra-type monastic community by Saint Euthymius the Great in 420 along the Ascent of Adummim, played a major role in the development of desert monasticism in Palestine, and in the spread of Chalcedonian orthodoxy in the country after the 451 Church Council. Fallen into ruin, it was rebuilt in the Crusader period, only to be abandoned again after its destruction at the beginning of the Mamluk period in the 13th century by Sultan Baybars. The structure was repurposed as a caravanserai or hhan for Muslim pilgrims travelling from Jerusalem to Mecca via the nearby shrine of Nabi Musa, and became known as Khan al-Ahmar, the "Red Khan".

=== Monastery of Martyrius ===
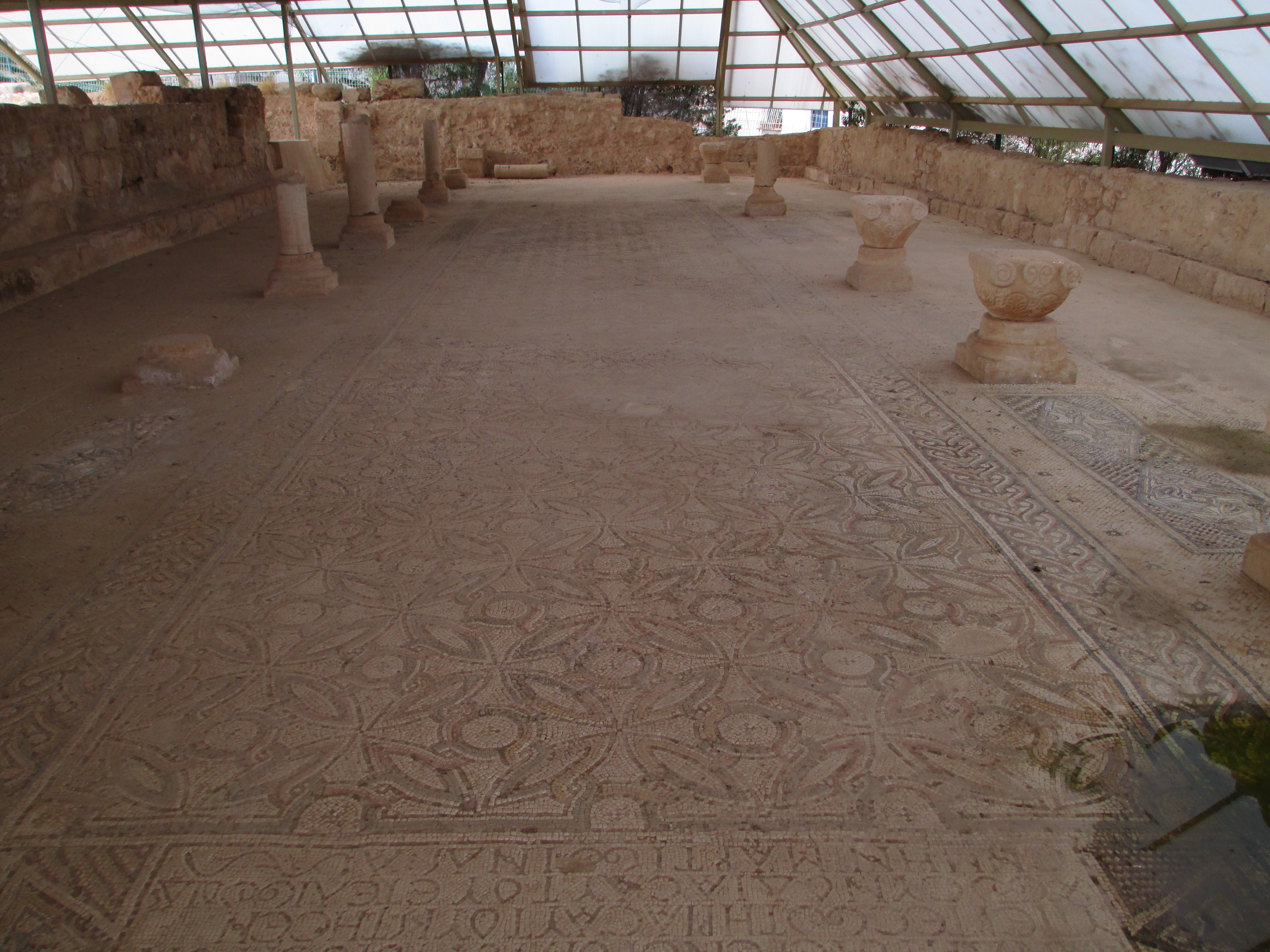
Mosaic floor of the refectory, Monastery of Martyrius at Ma'ale Adummim

The Monastery of Martyrius (5th–7th century), excavated in the centre of Ma'ale Adummim at a site known in Arabic as Khirbet el-Murassas, was an important Byzantine centre of monastic life in the Judaean desert.

== Other places in the area ==
The area is accessible via Israel Highway 1.

- Khan al-Ahmar, Palestinian village named after the khan. A number of Bedouin encampments centered around a larger one are collectively known as Khan al-Ahmar.
- Ma'ale Adummim, the largest Israeli settlement in the West Bank, and its industrial park, Mishor Adummim, were named after biblical Adummim

== See also ==
- Cities in the Book of Joshua
