= John of Choziba =

Saint

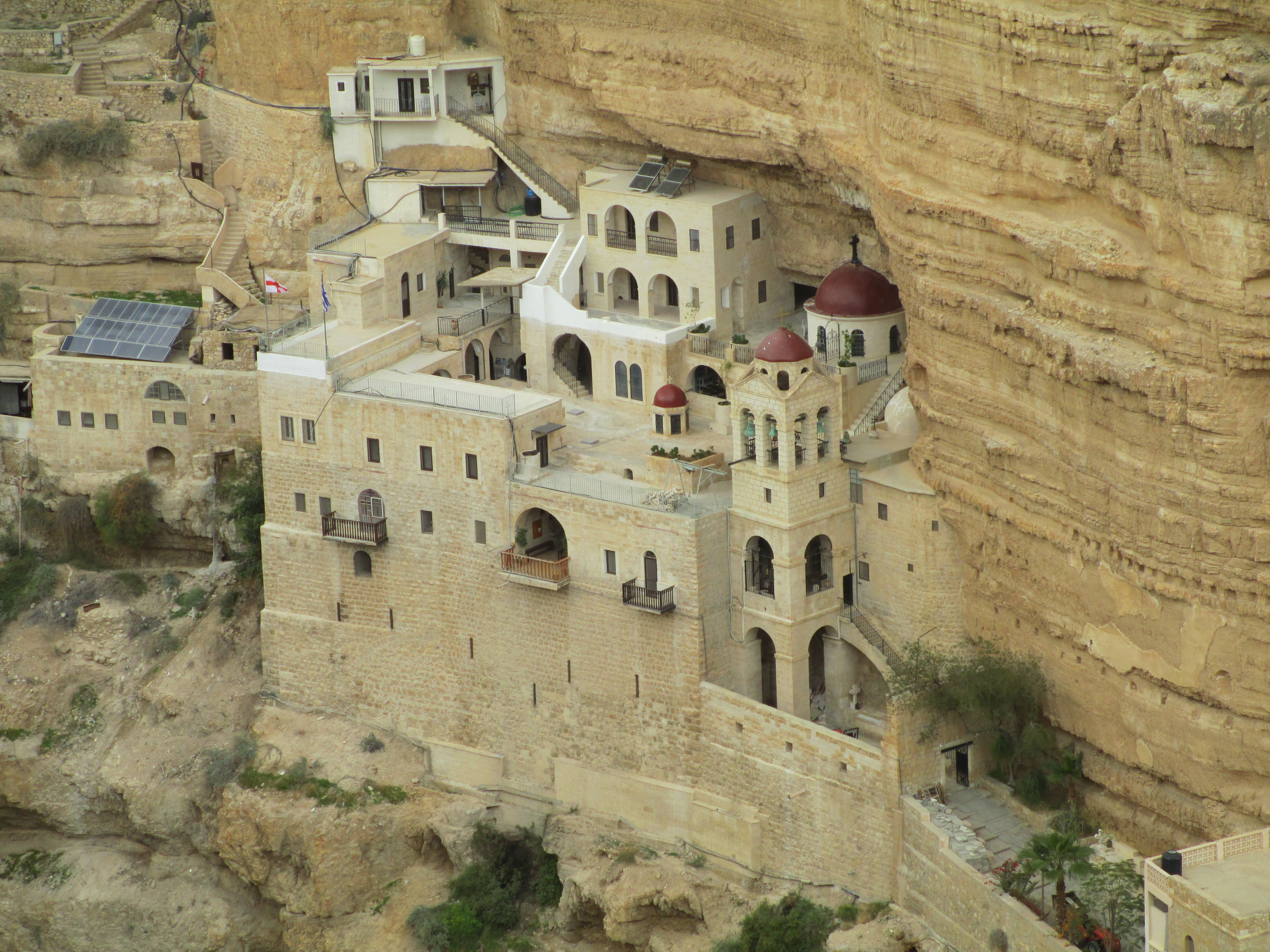
The monastery in Wadi Qelt

Saint John of Choziba, originally known as John of Thebes, was a monk who was born in Egypt around the year 440–450 CE. He abandoned monophysitism around 480 and moved to Wadi Qelt, a wadi in the Judaean Desert, where he reorganized the existing lavra into a monastery known as the monastery of Choziba. In 516, he became Bishop of Caesarea, but soon resigned and returned to the monastery of Choziba, where he died between 520 and 530.

He has been canonised as Saint John of Choziba.
