= Wadi Qelt =

Wadi in West Bank, Palestine

Coordinates: 31°50′40″N 35°24′51″E

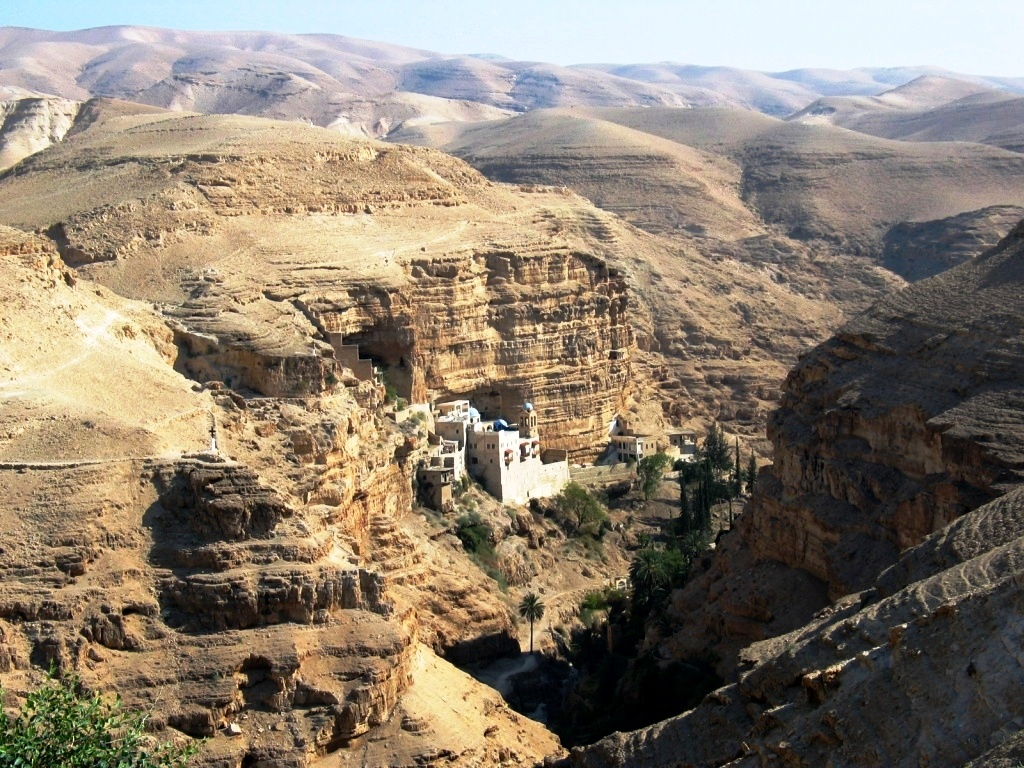
St. George's Monastery, Wadi Qelt

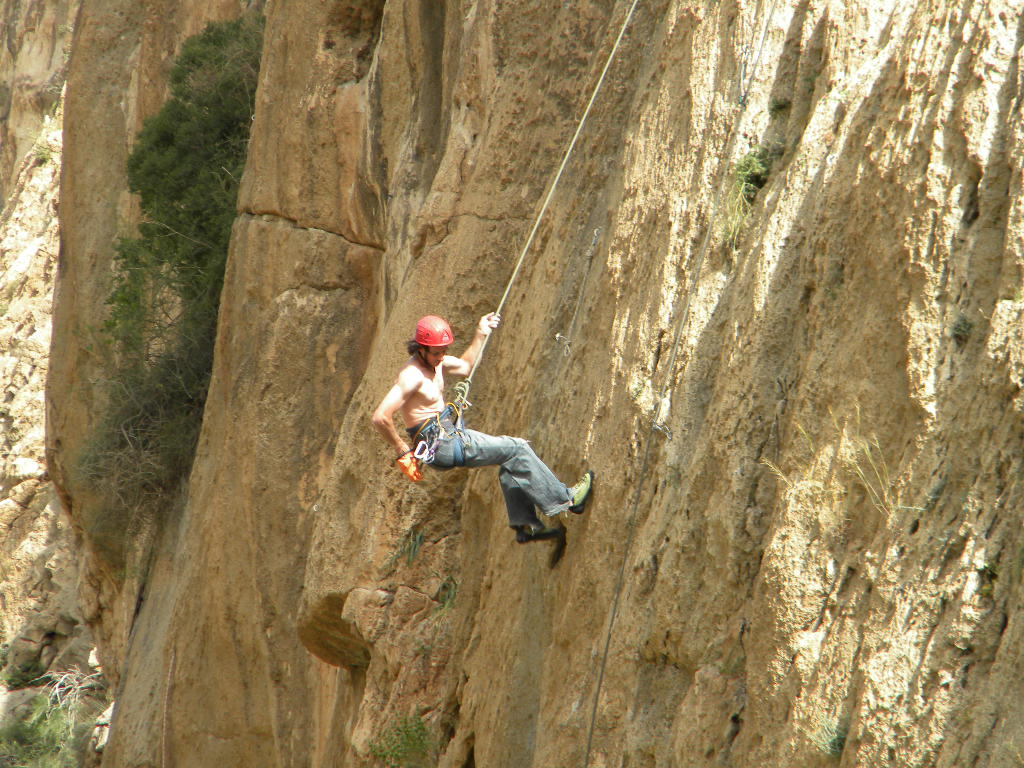
Rock climbing in Wadi Qelt

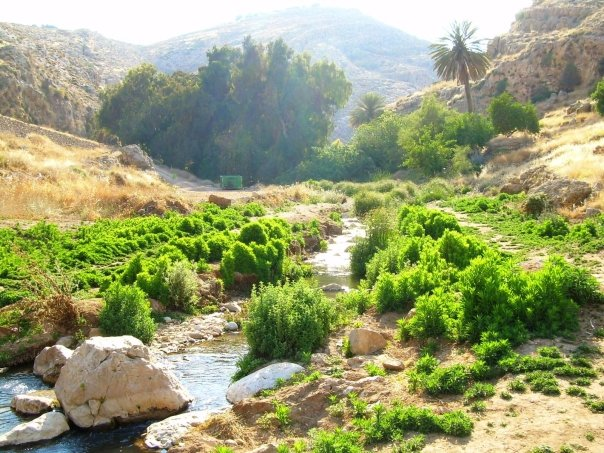
Nahal Prat stream

Wadi Qelt (Arabic: وادي القلط; Qelt is also spelled Qilt and Kelt, sometimes with the Arabic article, el- or al-), in Hebrew Nahal Prat (Hebrew: נחל פרת), formerly Naḥal Faran (Pharan brook), is a valley, riverine gulch or stream (Arabic: وادي wādī, "wadi"; Hebrew: נחל, "nahal") in the West Bank, originating near Jerusalem and running into the Jordan River near Jericho, shortly before it flows into the Dead Sea. Wadi Qelt is currently the generic name used for the entire stream, but in Arabic each sections has its own name: the upper course is called Wadi Fara, the middle one - Wadi Fawar, and just the lower - Wadi Qelt.

The wadi attracts with a number of natural, biblical, and archaeological highlights: a well preserved natural environment with a rich wild bird population.

== Geography ==
The stream flowing eastwards down the valley that cuts through the limestone of the Judean Mountains, has three perennial springs, each with an Arabic and Hebrew name: 'Ayn Farah/En Prat, the largest one at the head of the valley; 'Ayn Fawar/Ein Mabo'a in the centre; and the single-named Qelt spring a little farther down. In Hebrew the entire stream is called Prat; in Arabic though, each sections has its own name: Wadi Fara for the upper section, Wadi Fawar for the middle one, and Wadi Qelt for the lower section.

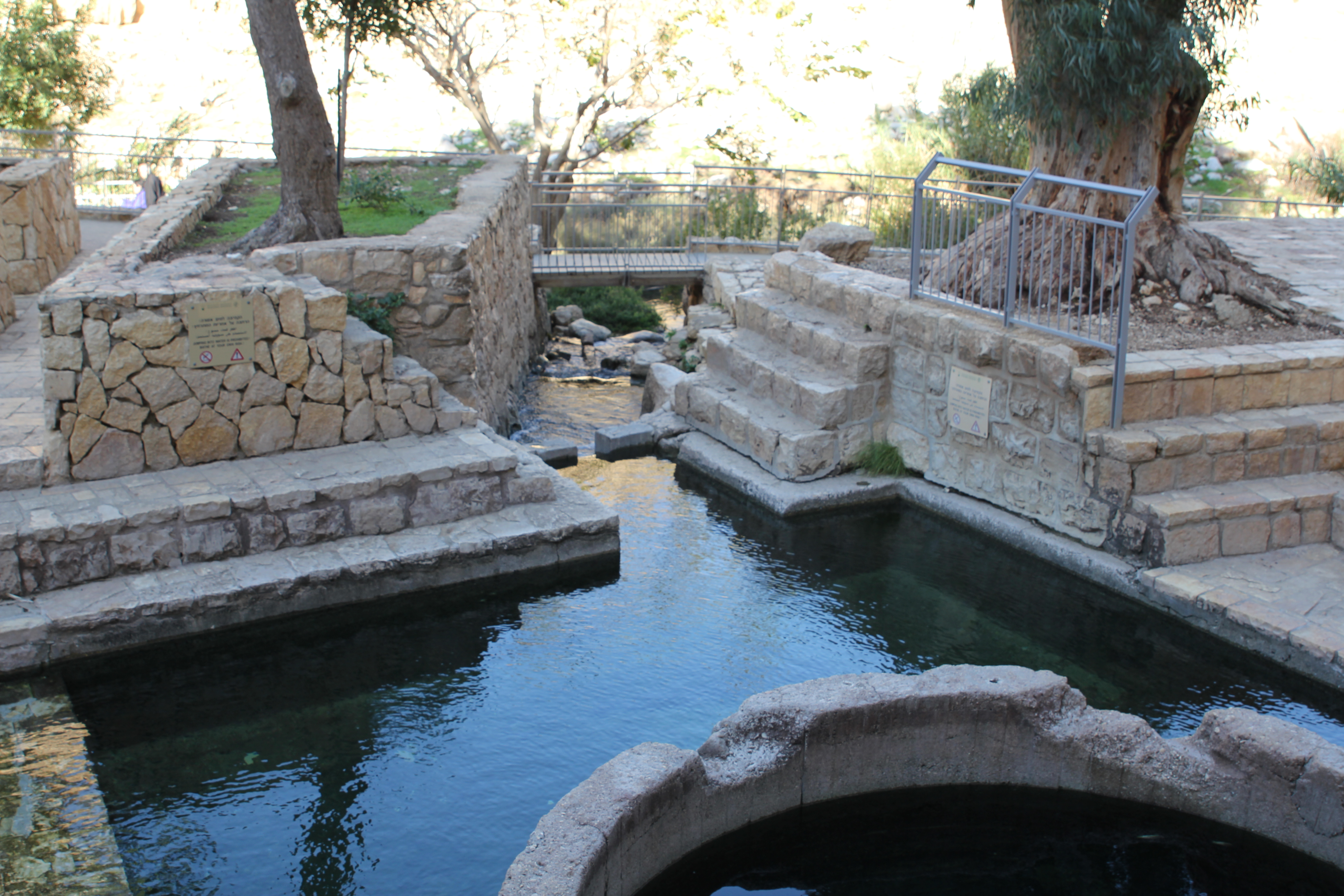
Ein Mabua, one of the springs inside Wadi Qelt

== Environment ==
Wadi Qelt is home to a unique variety of flora and fauna.

=== Important Bird Area ===
The 15,000 ha site has been recognised as an Important Bird Area (IBA) by BirdLife International because it supports populations of Eurasian eagle-owls, griffon vultures, Bonelli's eagles, and lesser kestrels.

== Religious relevance ==
=== Hebrew Bible ===
Joshua 15:7, 18:17 mentions Adummim in connection to an ascent leading up from Jericho towards Jerusalem. The ascent of Adummim, or its lower part, is identified with Wadi Qelt.

The stream Chorath or Cherath, mentioned in 1 Kings 17:3 as one of the hiding places of the prophet Elijah, has been identified by some with Wadi Kelt at St. George's Monastery. Other identifications have also been proposed.

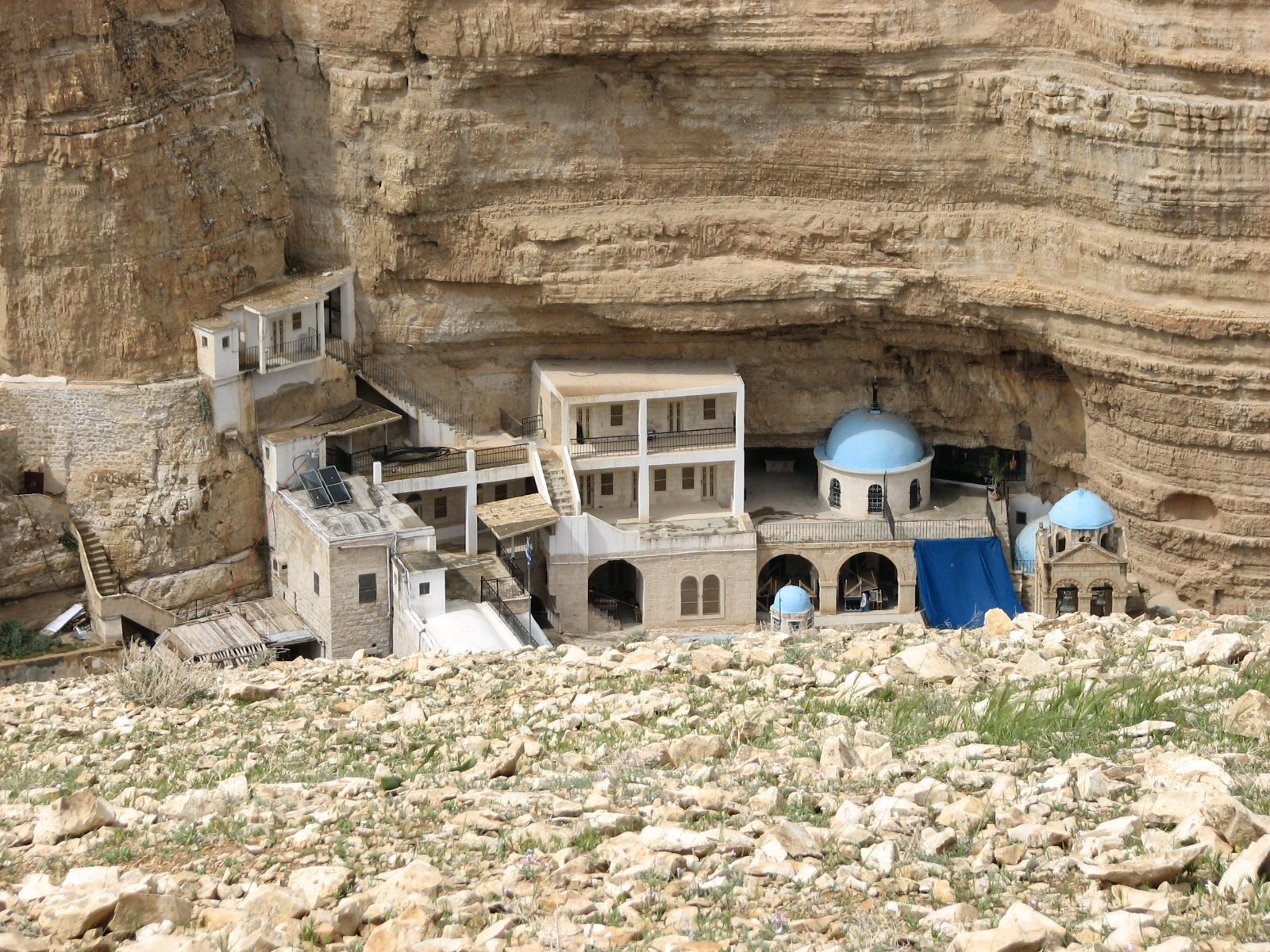
One of the largest monasteries in the Judean Desert within the Ein Qelt Nature Reserve.

The Wadi has sometimes been identified with the biblical Perath mentioned in Jeremiah 13:5.

It's possible that the Psalmist had Wadi Qelt in mind when he wrote Psalm 23.

=== Christian tradition ===
According to Christian tradition, this is the place in the desert where Joachim, the father of the Virgin Mary, prayed for a child and received a promise from God's angel, as narrated in the apocryphal Proto-Gospel of James.

St. George's Monastery, also connected to the Marian tradition, is built into the wadi cliffs a short distance upstream from the Cave of St Anne.

== History ==
=== Bronze Age and Iron Age ===
Qubur Bani Isra'in are very large Bronze-Age stone structures, which rise from a rocky plateau overlooking Wadi Qelt.

=== Hellenistic and Roman periods ===
Several aqueducts have been found along the stream, the oldest dating to the Hasmonean period (2nd century BCE). The aqueducts transported water from three main springs, down to the plain of Jericho.

The winter palaces of Hasmonean kings and Herod the Great stood at the lower end of the valley, where it reaches the Plain of Jericho. A structure within the Hasmonean royal winter palaces, identified by its excavator, Ehud Netzer, as a synagogue, is now known as the Wadi Qelt Synagogue, is believed to be one of the oldest synagogues in the world-- although its identification as a synagogue is contested by many scholars.

During the First Jewish war with Rome, insurgent leader Simon bar Giora is said to have held out in caves in this valley, known formerly as the Pharan brook.

=== Late Roman and Byzantine monasticism ===
Wadi Qelt (understood as the entire course of the stream, not just the lower course actually called Wadi Qelt by Arabs) contains monasteries and other old Christian locations. According to tradition, the first monastic settlement of the Judaean desert, the Pharan lavra, was established by St Chariton the Confessor towards the end of the 3rd century in upper Wadi Qelt, an area known to the Greek Orthodox as Pharan Valley.

The Monastery of Saint George was founded by John of Thebes around 480 AD, and it became an important spiritual centre in the sixth century under Saint George of Choziba. Hermits living in caves in nearby cliffs would meet in the monastery for a weekly mass and communal meal.

Another Byzantine monastery was excavated at the site known in Arabic as Khan Saliba. Its meager remains are located left at the left side of the T-junction of the road connecting the modern Highway 1 with the old road down the Ascent of Adummim (going to the right one reaches Jericho in the plain below.) The 5th-century Monastery of St Adam was built there "for there he stayed and wept at losing Paradise" (Epiphanius). Archaeologists found fine Byzantine mosaics at the former pilgrimage site.

=== 1948 ===
Towards the end of the 1948 Palestine war and from the outset of the Arab-Israeli war that followed, the springs of Wadi Qelt, which supplied much of the water for Jericho were a primary target for Israel's biological warfare programme, designed, by contaminating waters with typhus and diphtheria bacteria, to block the advance of the Arab Legion into the area which, in the United Nations Partition Plan for Palestine, had been destined for the Arab population. Some evidence suggests that a well-poisoning operation may have unfolded in this area in July of that year.

=== 1967 and after ===
The area was occupied by Israel in 1967.

On December 20, 1968, Israeli lieutenant-Colonel Zvi Ofer, commander of the elite Haruv unit, former Military Governor of Nablus and recipient of the Israeli medal of valour, was killed in action in Wadi Qelt while pursuing Arab militants who had crossed the Jordan.

== Tourism ==
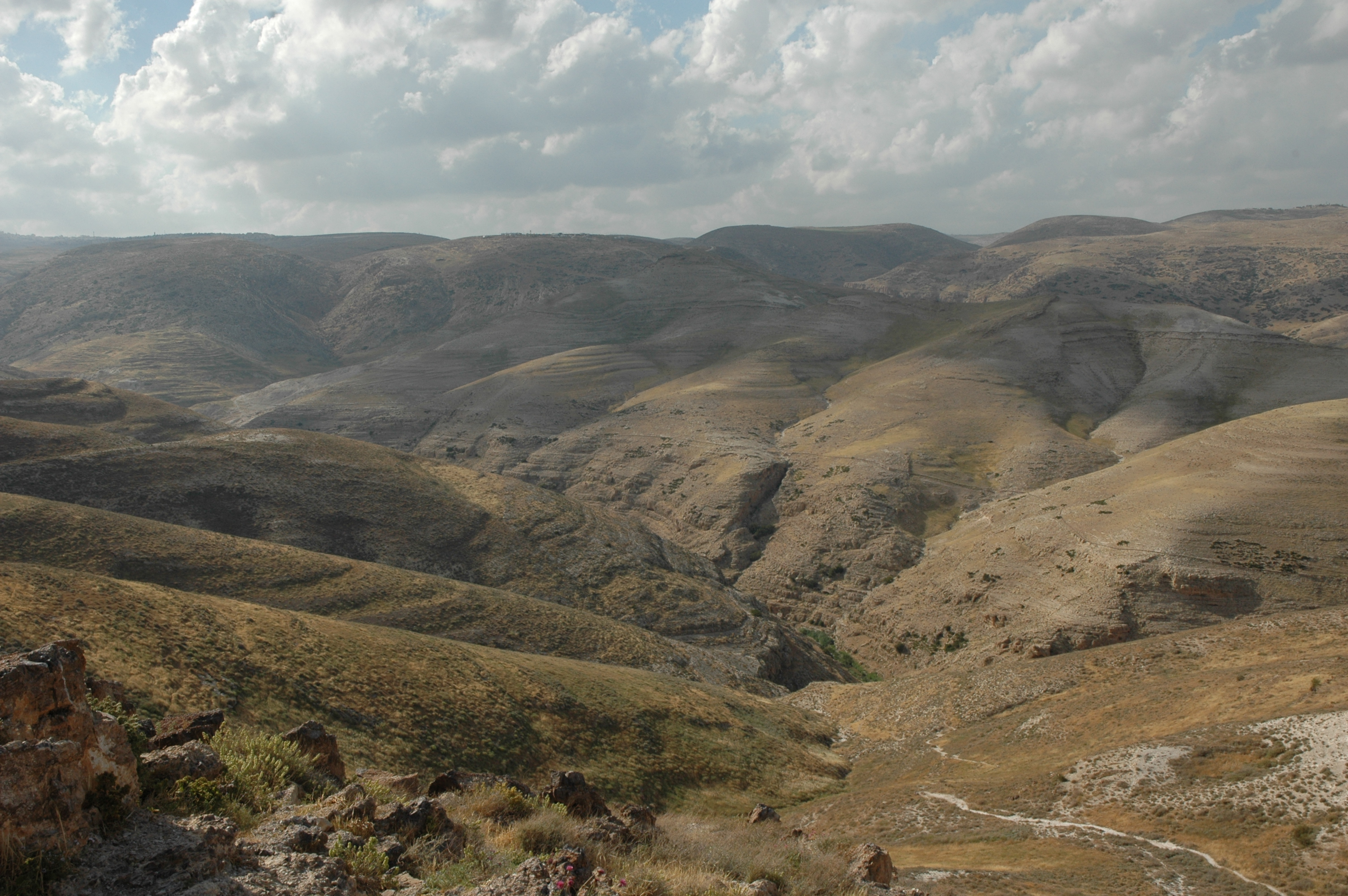
Wadi Qelt

Israel declared the upper parts of the wadi as a protected area under the name Ein Prat Nature Reserve.

Much of Wadi Qelt is a popular route for Palestinian and Israeli hikers. It is possible to hike all the way from the town of Hizma to Jericho, a journey of 25 kilometres and an 850m descent.

Israeli, Palestinian and foreign hikers use the partially marked paths along the wadi. Palestinians are generally able to visit when coming from Nablus, Ramallah and Jerusalem without having to pass through checkpoints.

== Bedouin ==
The wadi is used by many Bedouin shepherds. Some Bedouin and residents of Jericho are also earning their livelihood near the Monastery of St George, by offering donkey rides to pilgrims and selling them beverages and souvenirs.

== See also ==
- Chariton the Confessor, 3rd-century founder of a lavra-type monastery in Pharan Valley (upper Wadi Qelt)
- Jordan Valley
