= Yehuda Kroizer =

Israeli rabbi

Rabbi Yehuda Kroizer (Hebrew: יהודה קרויזר; born May 21, 1955, in Jerusalem) is the Chief Rabbi of Mitzpe Yericho and dean of Yeshivat Haraayon Hayehudi in Jerusalem.

== Biography ==
Kroizer studied at Yeshivat Har Etzion and the Yeshivat HaKotel and was ordained as a rabbi. Several years after getting married, he moved to the young settlement of Mitzpe Yericho, and in 1982 he was appointed as the rabbi of the settlement. In 1987, he began serving as the head of the Yeshivat HaRaayon HaYehudi in Jerusalem.

He studied at Yeshivat Hakotel where he received his rabbinical ordination and became the Chief Rabbi of Mitzpe Yericho in 1982. In 1987 he became the Rosh Yeshiva of ‘’Yeshivat Haraayon Hayehudi’’ (English: The Yeshiva of the Jewish Idea) in Jerusalem. His son, Yitzhak Kroizer, became a member of the Knesset for Otzma Yehudit in 2023.

Kroizer is married to Shlomit, the daughter of Eliyahu Carmel and sister of Rabbi Yosef Carmel. In 2007, two of his sons, Ishai and Shlomo, who was then an officer with the rank of lieutenant, were killed in a car accident.
