= Monastery of Saint George of Choziba =

Monastery in Wadi Qelt, West Bank, Palestine

Monastery of Saint George of Choziba (Mar Jaris)
- دير القديس جورج
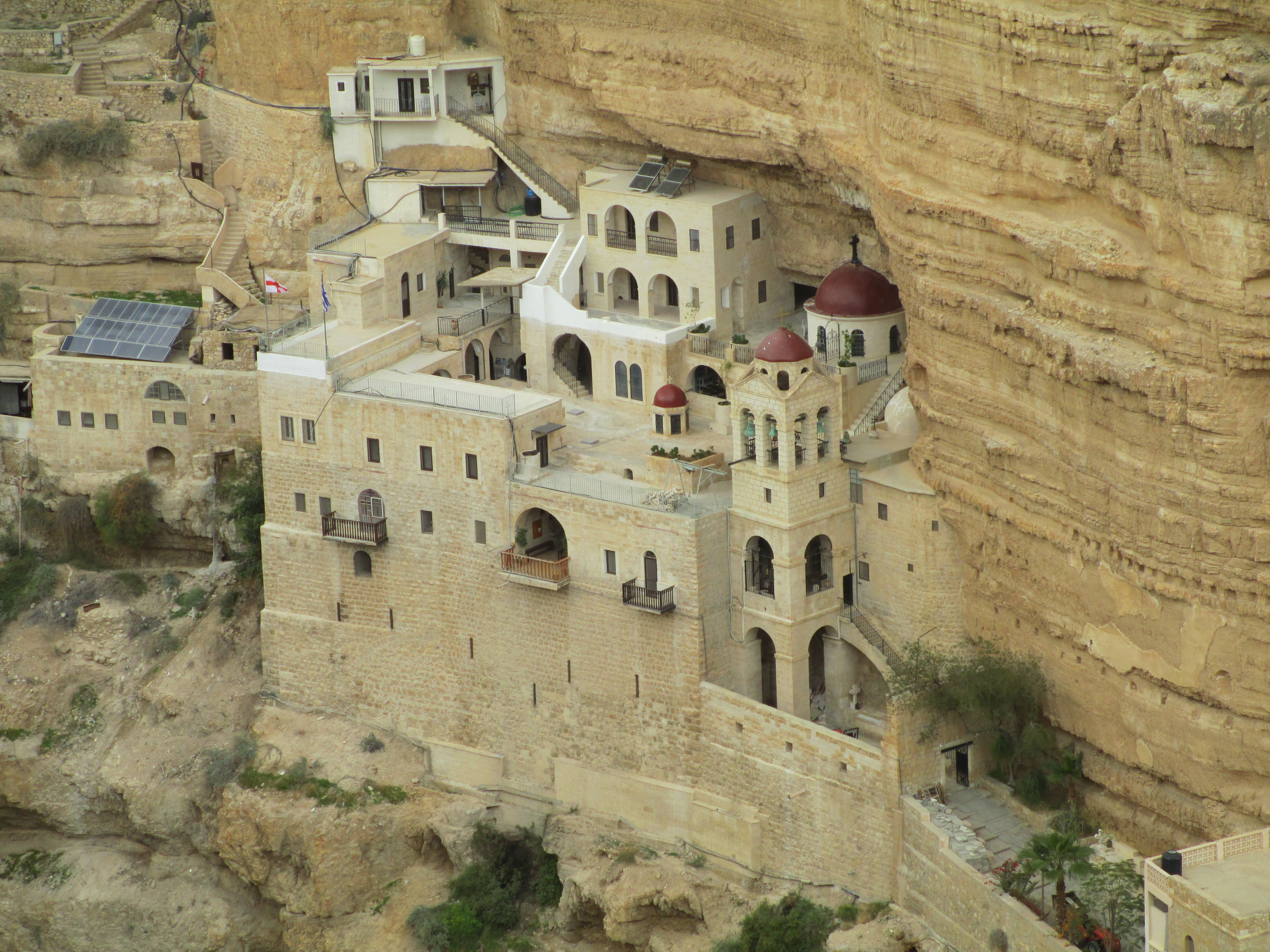

- Location within the West Bank Location within State of Palestine

Religion
- Affiliation: Eastern Orthodox Church, Greek Orthodox Patriarchate of Jerusalem

Location
- Location: Area C, Jericho Governorate, West Bank, Palestine
- Palestine grid: 1890/1389
- Coordinates: 31°50′35.5″N 35°24′53″E

The Monastery of Saint George of Choziba (Arabic: دير القديس جورج, Greek: Μονή Αγίου Γεωργίου του Χοζεβίτου, lit. Monastery of Saint George the Hozevite), also known as Monastery of Choziba (or Hoziba) or Mar Jaris, is a monastery located in Wadi Qelt in Area C, Jericho Governorate, West Bank, Palestine. The cliff-hanging complex, which emerged from a lavra established in the 420s and reorganised as a monastery around AD 500, with its ancient chapel and irrigated gardens, is active and inhabited by Greek Orthodox monks. It houses the relics of Saint George of Choziba, after whom the monastery is named, as well as the relics of Saint John of Choziba (420/450–520/530) and those of Saint John of Choziba the Romanian (1913–1960).

The monastery is reached by a pedestrian bridge across Wadi Qelt, which many believe to be Psalm 23's "valley of the shadow of death". The valley parallels the old Roman road to Jericho, the backdrop for the parable of the Good Samaritan (Luke 10:29–37). The monastery is open to pilgrims and visitors.

Established during the Byzantine period near Jericho, it was destroyed by the Persians in AD 614, rebuilt in the 12th century during the Crusader period, abandoned after their defeat, and rebuilt again by Greek monks starting at the end of the 19th century. The location of the monastery has been associated with the lives of Elijah and that of the parents of the Virgin Mary. That, allied with the Eastern Orthodox saints whose relics are kept in the monastery, both make it a site of intense pilgrimage.

== Names ==
The monastery was historically known as Monastery of Choziba (in Greek, Μονή Χοζεβά), pronounced "Hoziba". The name can also be found be transliterated as Hoziba, Chozeva or Hozeva.

After the death of George of Choziba, it came to be known as "the Monastery of Saint George of Choziba" (Μονή Αγίου Γεωργίου του Χοζεβίτου), or "St. George the Hozevite Monastery". Nowadays it is commonly known simply as Monastery of Saint George / Saint George's Monastery, or Mar Jaris in Arabic (also , but it is also often called Monastery of Saint George of Choziba, Monastery of Saints John and George of Choziba, St George Monastery in Wadi Qelt or St George Monastery (Jericho) to differentiate it from other religious sites that bear the name of Saint George of Lydda.

== Visiting ==
The monastery is situated in the West Bank, near the Palestinian city of Jericho. From Israel, the monastery is reachable from Highway 1 between the Dead Sea and Jerusalem, by turning off to Mitzpe Yericho and following signs for the monastery. There is a 3-hour long hiking path through the wadi and other paths above and along the wadi, or alternatively a parking lot across the wadi from the monastery with an adjacent lookout point. From the parking lot, it's a fairly short hike, about 1 km, but very steep going down to the monastery. It gets very hot at times, and hiking back up in the heat could be very challenging for some people. There are young men with donkeys who will give you a ride down to the monastery, or back up to the parking lot, for a negotiable fee.

You can also visit the Monastery by hiking through Wadi Qelt.

One can also hike up the wadi from Jericho, via the ruins of the Herodian winter palaces at Tulul Abu el-'Alayiq.

The monastery is open daily except on Sundays and certain holidays, between 9 am and 1 pm.

There is a strict dress code: no shorts for men; no trousers of any sort for women; women must wear a long skirt and a modest top.

== History ==
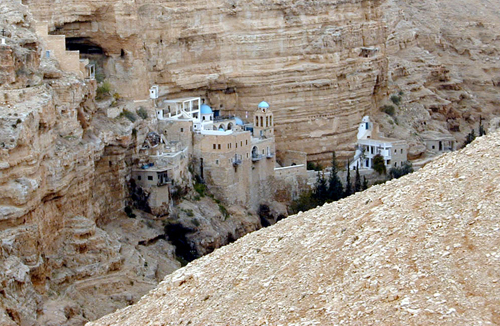
St. George Monastery seen from across Wadi Qelt

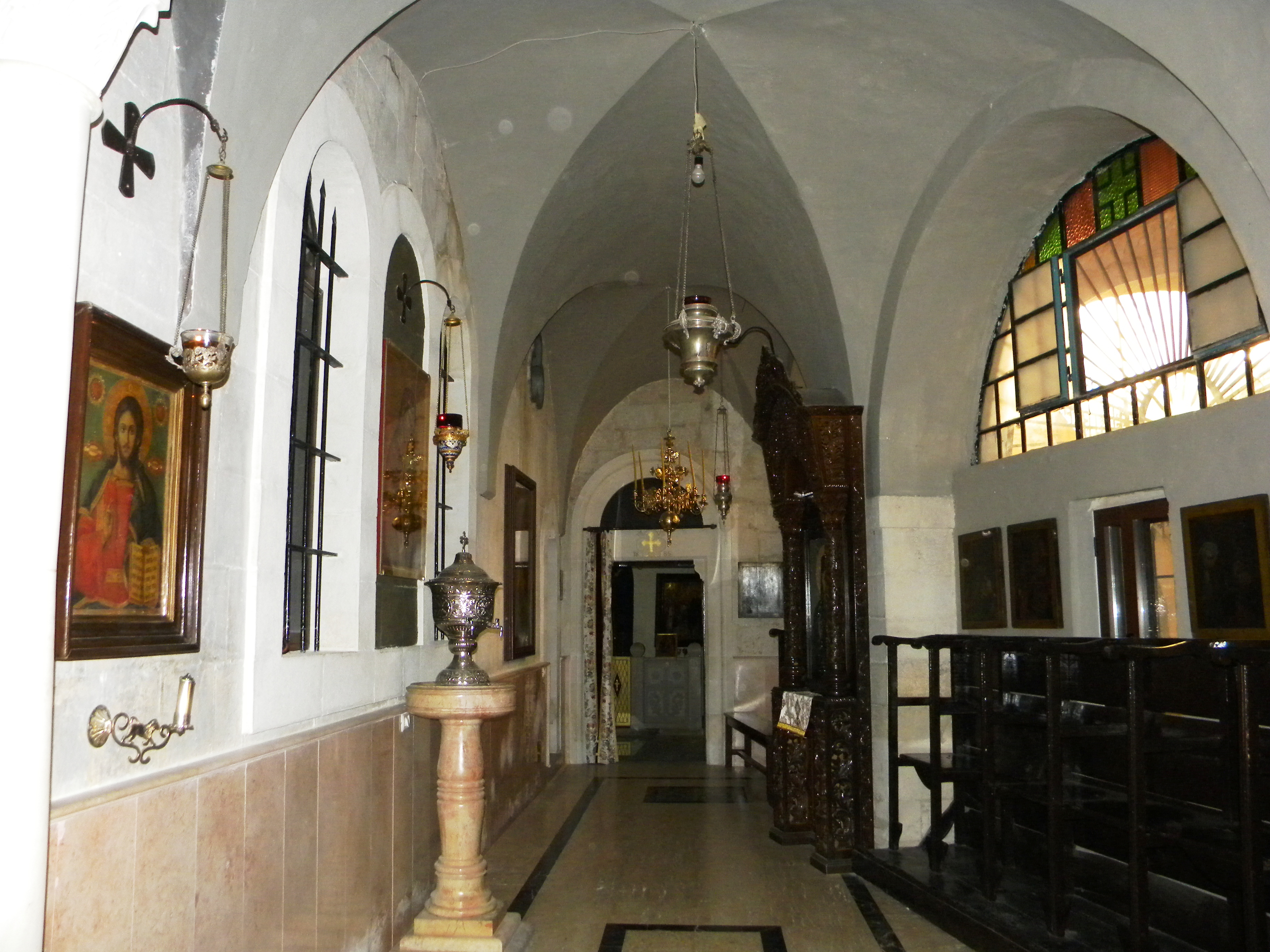
Corridor in front of the main church, leading to the Chapel of SS. John and George

=== Byzantine period ===
Monastic life at the future site of St. George's Monastery began around 420 CE as a lavra, with a few monks who sought the desert experience of the prophets, and settled around a cave where they believed Elijah was fed by ravens (1 Kings 17:5–6). Hermits living in caves in nearby cliffs would meet in the monastery for a weekly mass and communal meal.

Between 480 and 520/530, the lavra was reorganised as a monastery by John of Thebes, also known as Saint John of Choziba, who had moved to Syria Palaestina from Egypt. In his time it was dedicated to the Mother of God.

The monastery became an important spiritual centre in the sixth-seventh century under Saint George of Choziba (died c. 620). The monastery was eventually renamed after him.

At this time the monastery contained the original small chapel dedicated to Saint Stephen and a church of the Virgin Mary.

Destroyed in 614 by the Persians, the monastery was more or less abandoned after the Persians swept through the valley and massacred the fourteen monks who dwelt there.

=== Early Muslim period ===
In the late eighth-century writings the monastery starts being associated with the parents of St Mary, Saints Joachim and Anne. A monk from that period mentions a "House of Joachim".

=== Crusader period ===
After the 614 destruction by the Persians, the monastery was rebuilt during the Crusader period. Manuel I Komnenos made some restoration in 1179, and, according to an inscription, Frederick II made further restorations in 1234. After the Crusaders were defeated and pushed out of the region, the monastery was again abandoned. The Russian pilgrim Agrefeny was the last person to mention visiting it around 1370.

=== Modern period ===
The monastery was re-established in 1878, and has since then been in the care of the following monks or abbots:

- Father Kalinikos (1830–1909)
- Father Amphilochios (1913–1986)
- Father Antonios Iosiphidis (died 1993)
- Father Germanos (Georgios Tsibouktzakis; murdered 2001)
- Father Constantinos (current abbot, as of 2019).

In 1878, a Greek monk, Kalinikos, settled here and restored the monastery, finishing it in 1901 with the assistance of the Jerusalem Patriarchate.

==== St John (Iacob) the Romanian ====
Romanian monk-priest, Father Ioan (John), born Ilie Iacob in 1913, left the Romanian skete on the River Jordan where he had been abbot since 1947, and moved in 1952 to the Monastery of Saint George of Choziba together with his attendant and disciple, Ioanichie Pârâială. Following summer, the two retreated to the nearby Cave of St Anne, which Father John never left again. Affected by illness, he died seven years later, in 1960. In 1992 he was declared a saint by the Romanian Orthodox Patriarchate and in 2016 he was officially recognised as such by the Greek Orthodox Patriarchate of Jerusalem. His name was added to the official name of the monastery. His relics are in the chapel of the main monastery's church, next to the relics of Saints John of Thebes and Saint George of Choziba. He is known as Saint John (Iacob) the New Chozevite; Saint John the Romanian; or Saint John of Neamț.

==== Father Germanos (Tsibouktzakis) ====
Father Germanos came to St George's in 1993 and lived there until he was killed by Arab terrorists during the Second Intifada in 2001. For many years he was the sole occupant of the monastery, of which he was named abbot in 2000. Emulating the Wadi Qelt monks of late antiquity, Father Germanos offered hospitality to visitors, improved the stone path used by pilgrims to climb up to the monastery, repaired the aqueducts, and improved the gardens of shade and olive trees.

== Religious traditions and relics ==
The traditions attached to the monastery include a visit by Elijah en route to the Sinai Peninsula, and St. Joachim, whose wife Anne was infertile, weeping here when an angel announced to him the news of Mary's conception.

Relics of the three saints closely associated with Choziba – John of Thebes, George of Choziba and St John (Iacob) the New Chozebite – are kept in the monastery's main church.

The bones and skulls of the martyred monks killed by the Persians in 614 CE are kept today in a chapel outside the monastery walls.
