= Autoroute 55 =

Autoroute 55 may refer to:

- A55 autoroute, in France
- Quebec Autoroute 55, in Quebec, Canada

== See also ==
- A55 roads
- List of highways numbered 55
