= List of highways numbered 55 Business =

Route 55 Business or Highway 55 Business may refer to:

- I-55 Business, business routes for Interstate 55
- Georgia State Route 55 Business (former)
- M-55 Business, former business route for M-55

== See also ==
- List of highways numbered 55
- List of highways numbered 55A
