= Highway 50 (Israel–Palestine) =

Highway in Israel and Palestine

Coordinates: 31°48′07″N 35°12′08″E

Highway 50
- כביש 50
- Menahem Begin Boulevard; Hebrew: כביש בגין, romanized: Kvish Begin; Begin Expressway; Hebrew: שדרות מנחם בגין, romanized: Sderot Menahem Begin
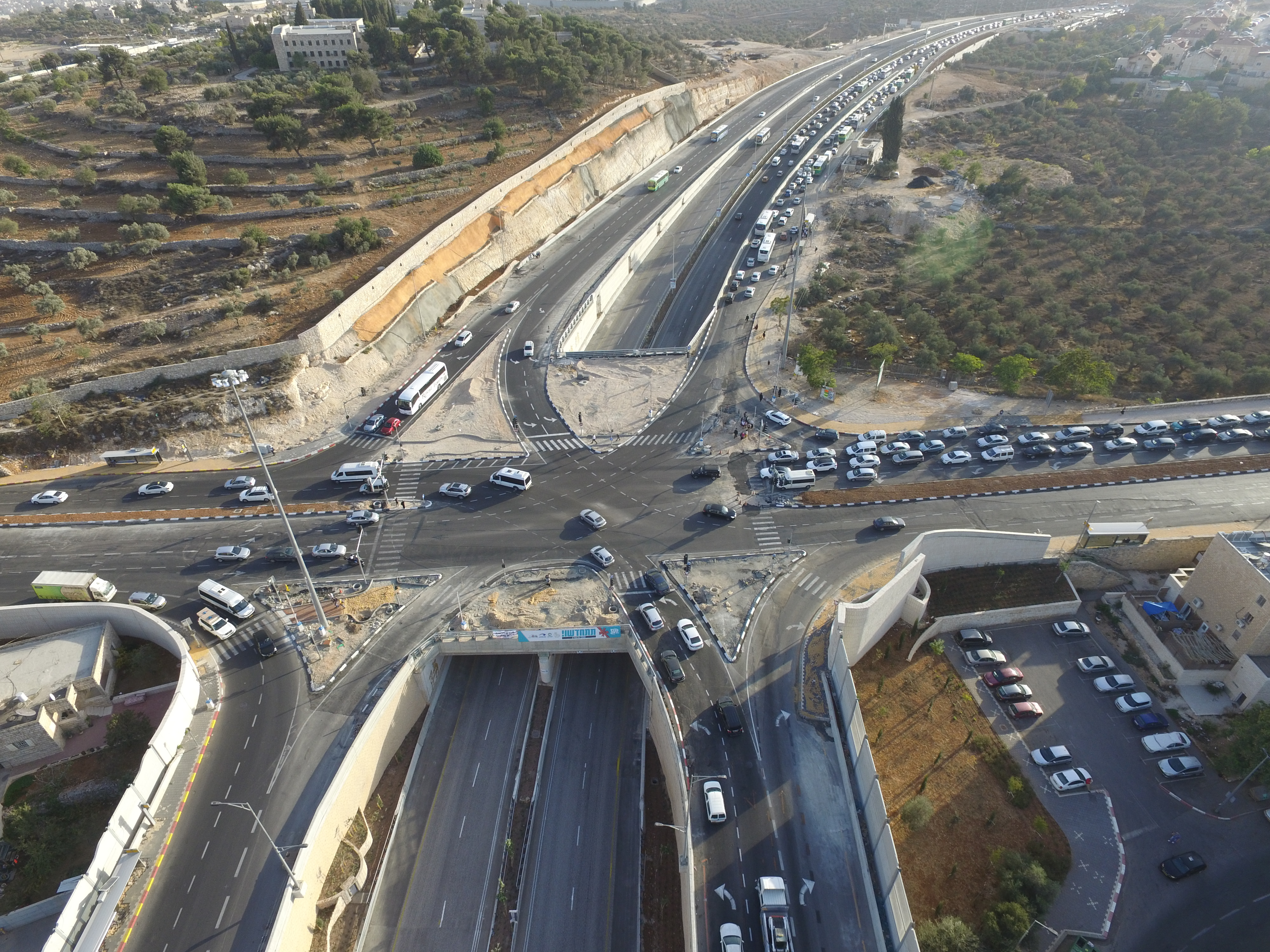
- Southward toward Rozmarin Interchange

Route information
- Length: 15.68 km (9.74 mi)
- Existed: June 1998–present

Major junctions
- South end: Rozmarin Interchange
- Dov Yosef Interchange; Malha Interchange; Golomb Interchange; Givat Mordechai Interchange; Kiryat Moshe Interchange; Givat Shaul Interchange; Golda Meir Interchange; Yigael Yadin Interchange; Benzion Netanyahu Interchange
- North end: Atarot Junction

Location
- Country: Israel
- Major cities: Jerusalem; Neighborhoods: Gilo, Beit Safafa, Malha/Manahat, Holyland, Katamonim, Bayit VeGan, Beit HaKerem, Givat Mordechai, Kiryat Moshe, Kiryat HaLeom, Givat Shaul, Har Hotzvim, Ramot, Beit Hanina, Atarot

Highway system
- Roads in Israel; Highways
← Highway 46	→ Highway 55
← Route 402	Route 404	→ Route 406

Highway 50 (formerly Route 404), officially called Begin Boulevard (Hebrew: שדרות בגין, Sderot Begin) and also referred to as Menachem Begin Expressway or Begin Highway, is a north–south urban freeway, through western Jerusalem, named after Israel's sixth Prime Minister, Menachem Begin. Local Jerusalemites simply refer to it as 'Begin' (Hebrew pronunciation: [ˈbegin]). It enters Area C of the West Bank on the north end and East Jerusalem on both ends.

== Route ==
The road follows a south–north path that connects key neighbourhoods and commercial areas, as well as several city arteries and national routes. Beginning at the Rosmarin Interchange (formerly the Tunnels Junction) of the Gush Road in Gilo, the road arcs north-westward through Gilo, Beit Safafa, and Sharafat turning northward through Malha. Passing Golomb Blvd, the road travels below a high ridge to the west on which sits the Holyland Park building complex. To the east is Emek Hatzva'im (Gazelle Valley), a green zone that was previously leased to Kiryat Anavim and Ma'ale HaHamisha and used for agricultural purposes. Further on, the path was excavated to create a depressed roadway between Bayit Vegan, Givat Mordechai, Ramat Beit HaKerem and Givat Ram. This section is equipped with noise barriers and speed cameras.

The road then passes through two tunnels under Jaffa Road and the busy western entrance to Jerusalem. Winding down the western and northern slopes below Romema, the road steeply descends 150 meters into Emek HaArazim (Valley of Cedars) with interchanges at Golda Meir Blvd (Route 436) and Yigal Yadin Blvd (Highway 1). Passing between Ramot and Ramat Shlomo, the road continues through the West Bank passing Beit Hanina, Bir Nabala and Atarot. Finally at Atarot Junction, Highway 50 officially becomes Highway 45 providing a continuous connection to Route 443 to Modi'in and the Tel Aviv area.

== History ==
Old designation

Begin Boulevard is made of the central section, which was completed two years ahead of schedule in June 1998, and the northern extension completed in late 2002

Since its construction, the road has been called national Route 404. In internal Jerusalem Municipality documentation, it was known as Jerusalem Road 4. In 2012, the Israel Ministry of Transport and the Jerusalem Municipality began using the designation 50. New blue Highway 50 signs were posted by the National Roads Company of Israel to reflect this change. The Moriah-Jerusalem Development Corporation, responsible for road construction in Jerusalem also uses the designation 50.

=== 50/20 ===
In the north, the "50/20 Interchange Project" was approved in 2010 along with the new Jerusalem Road 20 through Beit Hanina following Abdul Hamid Shomaan St. and Hizma Rd. to Sayeret Duchifat Blvd. Construction was begun in 2011. This route alleviates heavy traffic at Sha'ar Mizrach Junction (Highway 1 and Route 60) by providing an alternative route via Begin to central Jerusalem and Route 443 to Tel Aviv for residents of Beit Hanina, Shuafat, Pisgat Ze'ev and Neve Ya'akov. The preliminarily named "50/20 Interchange" was officially opened on 5 May 2013 and renamed after Benzion Netanyahu, the Israeli historian and father of Benjamin Netanyahu.

=== Begin South ===
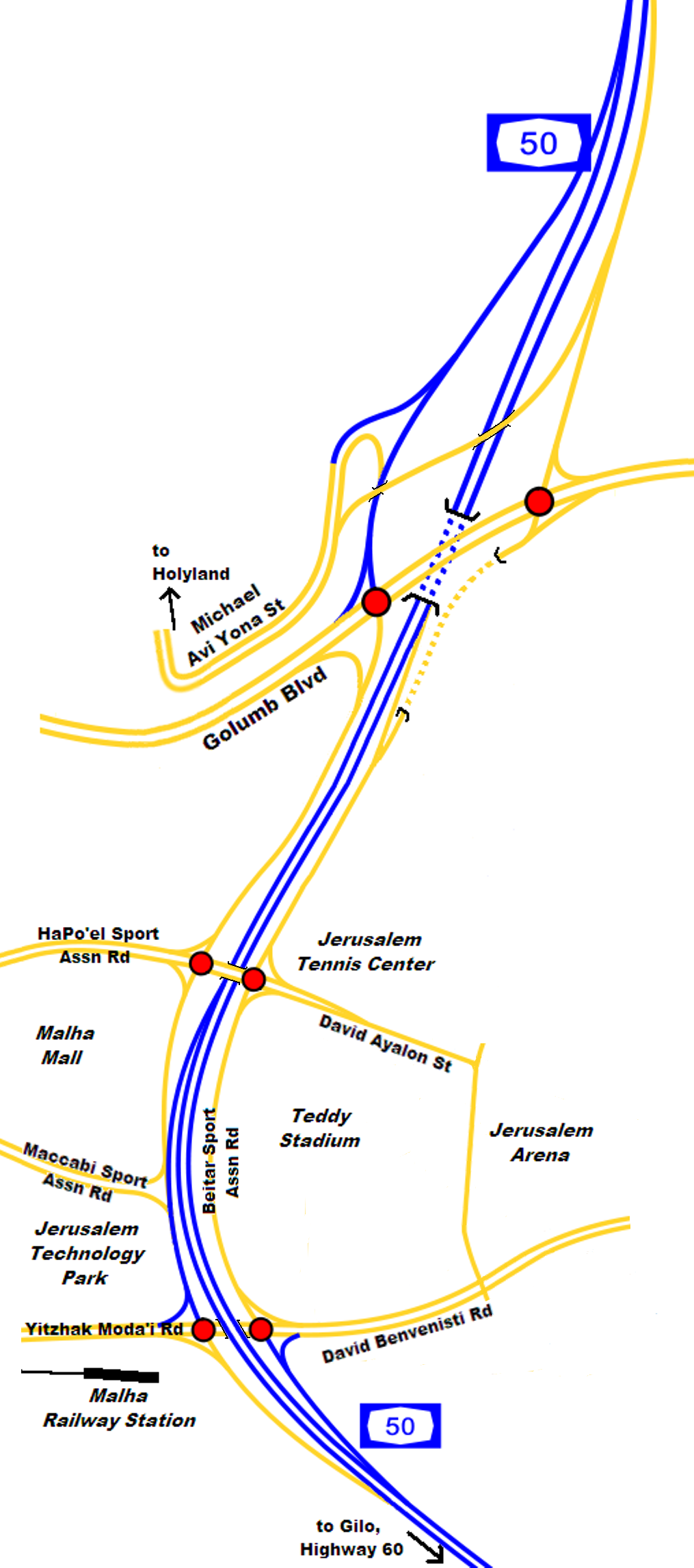
Begin South

The "Begin South Project", first planned in 1990, involved widening Begin Boulevard from 4 to 6 lanes and extending it as a freeway past Golomb Boulevard to connect with Route 60 at the Tunnels Road in Gilo to Gush Etzion. Construction proceeded in stages beginning in 2010 to widen the highway between Givat Mordechai Interchange and Golomb Junction. At the same time, reconstruction of sewer lines further south was completed to accommodate the lowering of the highway to pass under Golomb Boulevard and local streets next to the Malha Mall, Teddy Stadium and the Jerusalem Malha Railway Station with interchange access to these locations. In 2013, a tunnel was built creating the new Golomb Interchange, and work proceeded to lower the road past the Malha Mall and Teddy Stadium with service roads on either side. This first stage was completed at the end of 2014.

Further south, past the Malha Railway Station, work continued through the neighbourhood of Sharafat with the completion of the second stage and the opening of the Dov Yosef Interchange in March 2015.

The final stage of the project between Dov Yosef Boulevard and Rosmarin Street through the neighbourhood of Beit Safafa went ahead despite the residents' objections and requests for a tunnel. The highway was built as a slightly depressed roadway with a 200-meter-wide, park-covered bridge at al-Qa'ash St. connecting the southwest corner of the neighbourhood with its center. Ongoing litigation between the residents and the municipality regarding the proximity of the highway to houses and the desire for additional crossing points continued during the construction process. Construction of ramps to Rosmarin Street were completed in the spring of 2016, while the underpass of Rosmarin Interchange connecting Highway 50 with Highway 60 southward was completed in September 2017. The total cost for the project was 1.1 B Shekels.

== Connection to Road 16 ==
Begin Boulevard has been connected at Givat Mordechai Interchange to Highway 1 at the new Motza Interchange via the new Jerusalem Road 16. The road travels mostly through a series of tunnels under the parking lots of Shaare Zedek Medical Center and the west Jerusalem neighbourhoods of Yefeh Nof and Har Nof. In the center, the above-ground Nahal Revida Interchange leads to Givat Shaul. Upon completion in 2022, this created another entrance to Jerusalem to ease the traffic congestion at the Ben Gurion Blvd./Jaffa Road entrance and provide direct access to south Jerusalem from the west. The plan was completed despite stiff resistance on ecological grounds due to the above-ground section at Nahal Revida located in the Jerusalem Forest.

== Interchanges & Junctions (South to North) ==
District	Location	km	mi	Name	Destinations	Notes
Jerusalem	Gilo	0.00	0.00	מחלף רוזמרין (Rosmarin Interchange)	Highway 60	
Jerusalem	Beit Safafa	1.42	0.88	מחלף דב יוסף (Dov Yosef Interchange)	Dov Yosef Blvd.	
Green Line
Jerusalem	Malha	2.43	1.51	מחלף מלחה (Malha Interchange)	Road 3755 (Yitzhak Moda'i St.); Agudat Sport HaPoel Rd. David Benvenisti St.	
Jerusalem	Katamonim	3.28	2.04	מחלף גולומב (Golomb Interchange)	Golomb Blvd.	
Jerusalem	Givat Mordechai	4.32	2.68	מנהרות בייט (Beyth Tunnels)	Shmuel Beyth Street	4 lanes, 310 metres
Jerusalem	Givat Mordechai	4.57	2.84	מחלף גבעת מרדכי (Givat Mordechai Interchange)	Highway 16; Bezalel Bazak Street	
Jerusalem	Kiryat Moshe	6.75	4.19	מחלף קרית משה (Kiryat Moshe Interchange)	Yitzhak Rabin St.	
Jerusalem	Romema	6.83	4.24	מנהרת ליפתא (Lifta Tunnel)	Jaffa Road	6 lanes, 570 metres
Jerusalem	Givat Shaul	7.49	4.65	מחלף גבעת שאול (Givat Shaul Interchange)	Route 333	
Jerusalem	Har Hotzvim	9.15	5.69	מחלף גולדה מאיר (Golda Meir Interchange)	Route 436	
Green Line
Jerusalem	Ramot neighbourhood	9.93	6.17	מחלף יגאל ידין (Yigael Yadin Interchange)	Highway 1 Route 436	
Jerusalem	Beit Hanina	11.97	7.44	מחלף בן ציון נתניהו (Benzion Netanyahu Interchange)	Road 4197	
Jerusalem	Atarot	15.68	9.74	צומת עטרות (Atarot Junction)	Highway 45	
1.000 mi = 1.609 km; 1.000 km = 0.621 mi

== Gallery ==
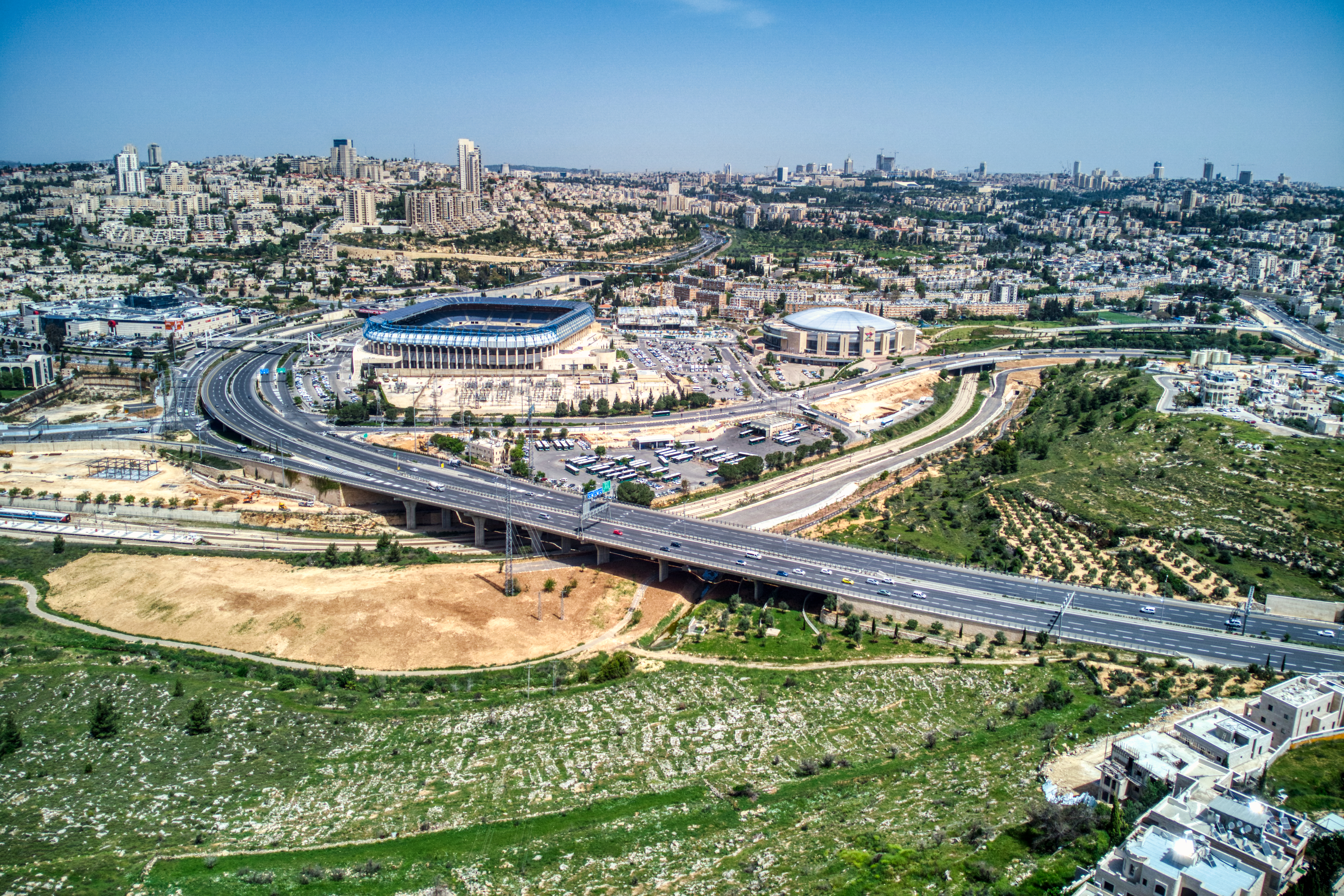
Near Teddy Stadium and above Jaffa–Jerusalem railway

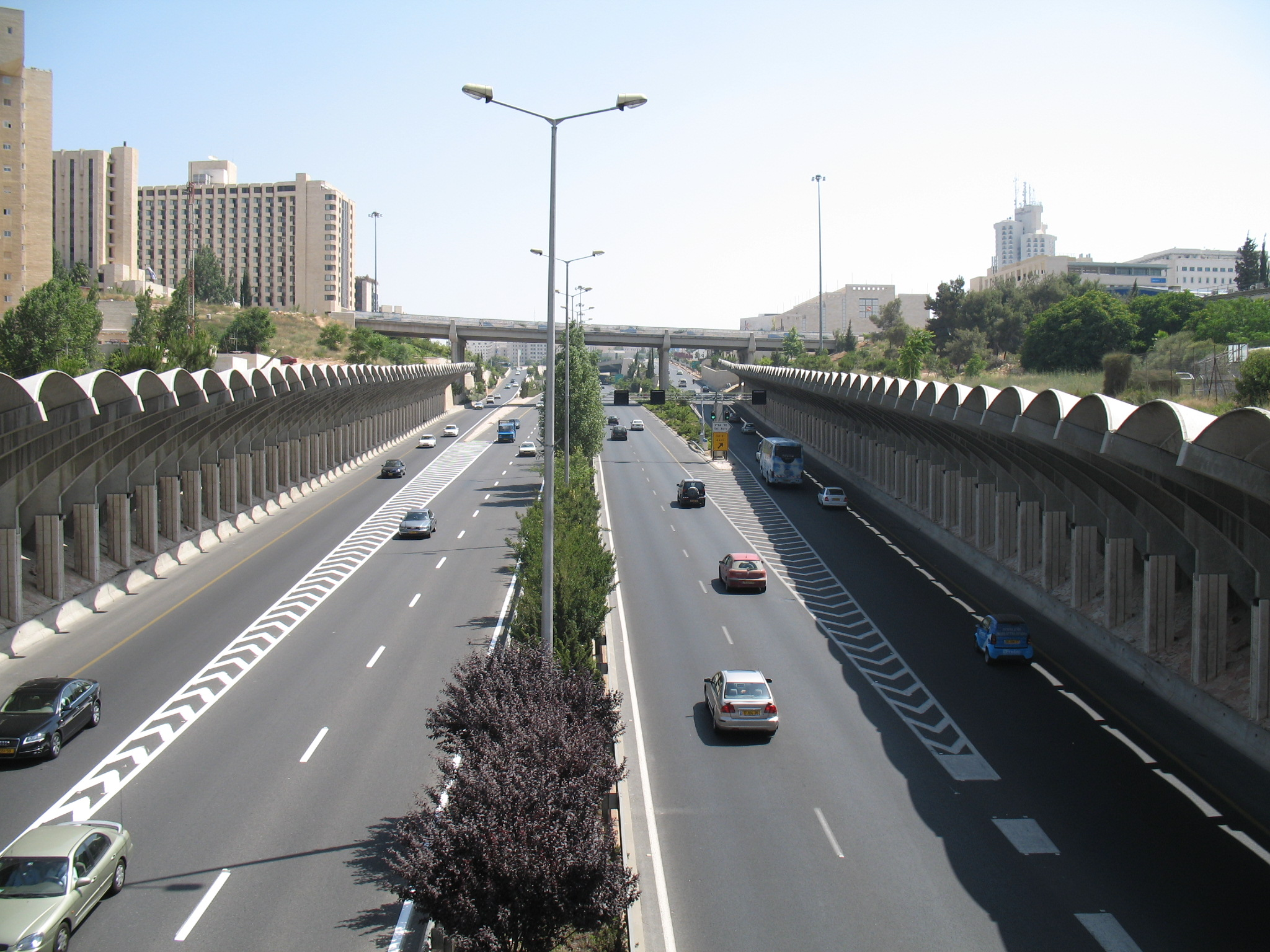
Northward toward Kiryat Moshe Interchange with noise barriers

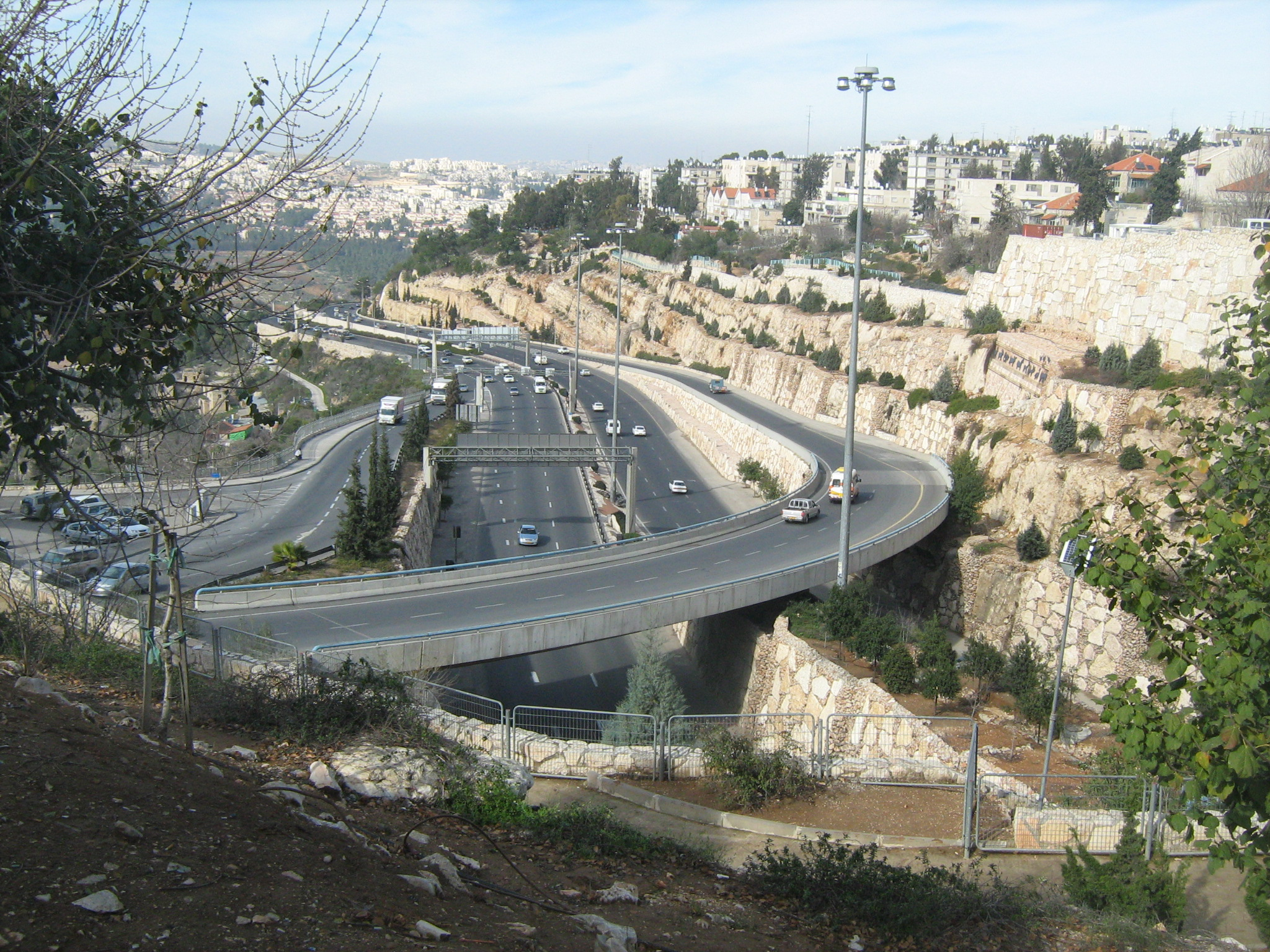
Northward toward Givat Shaul Interchange

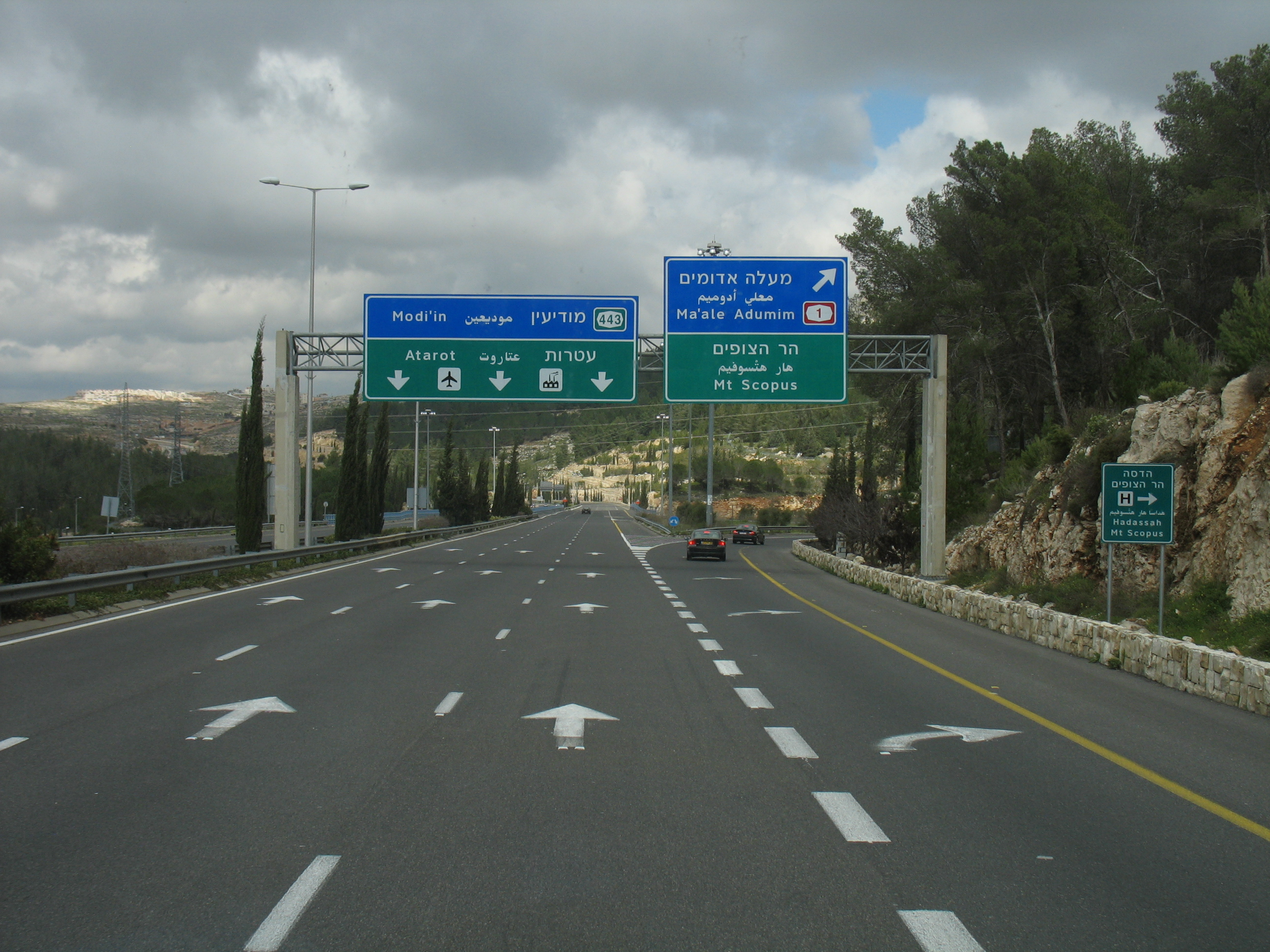
Northward at Yigal Yadin Interchange

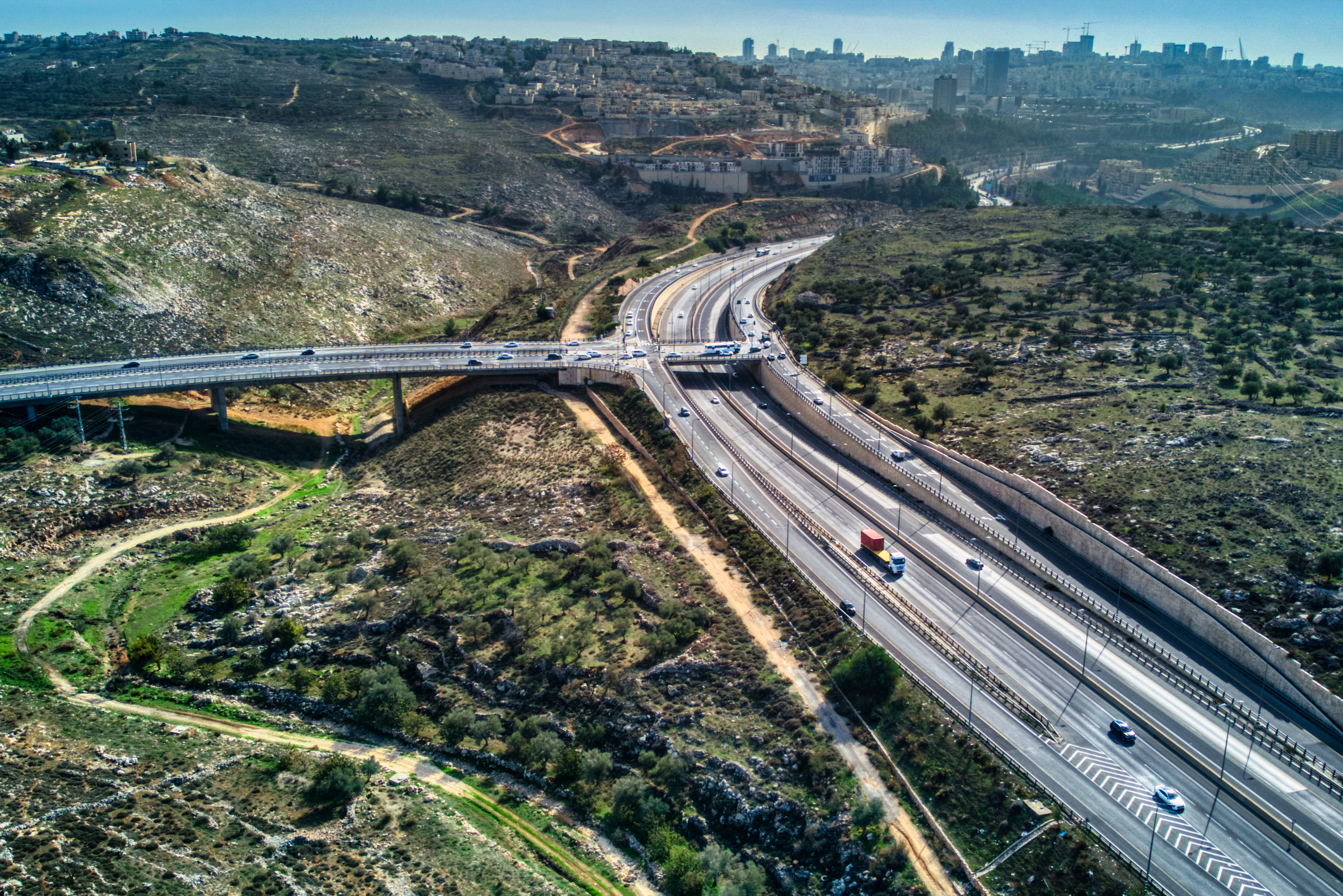
Benzion Netanyahu Interchange

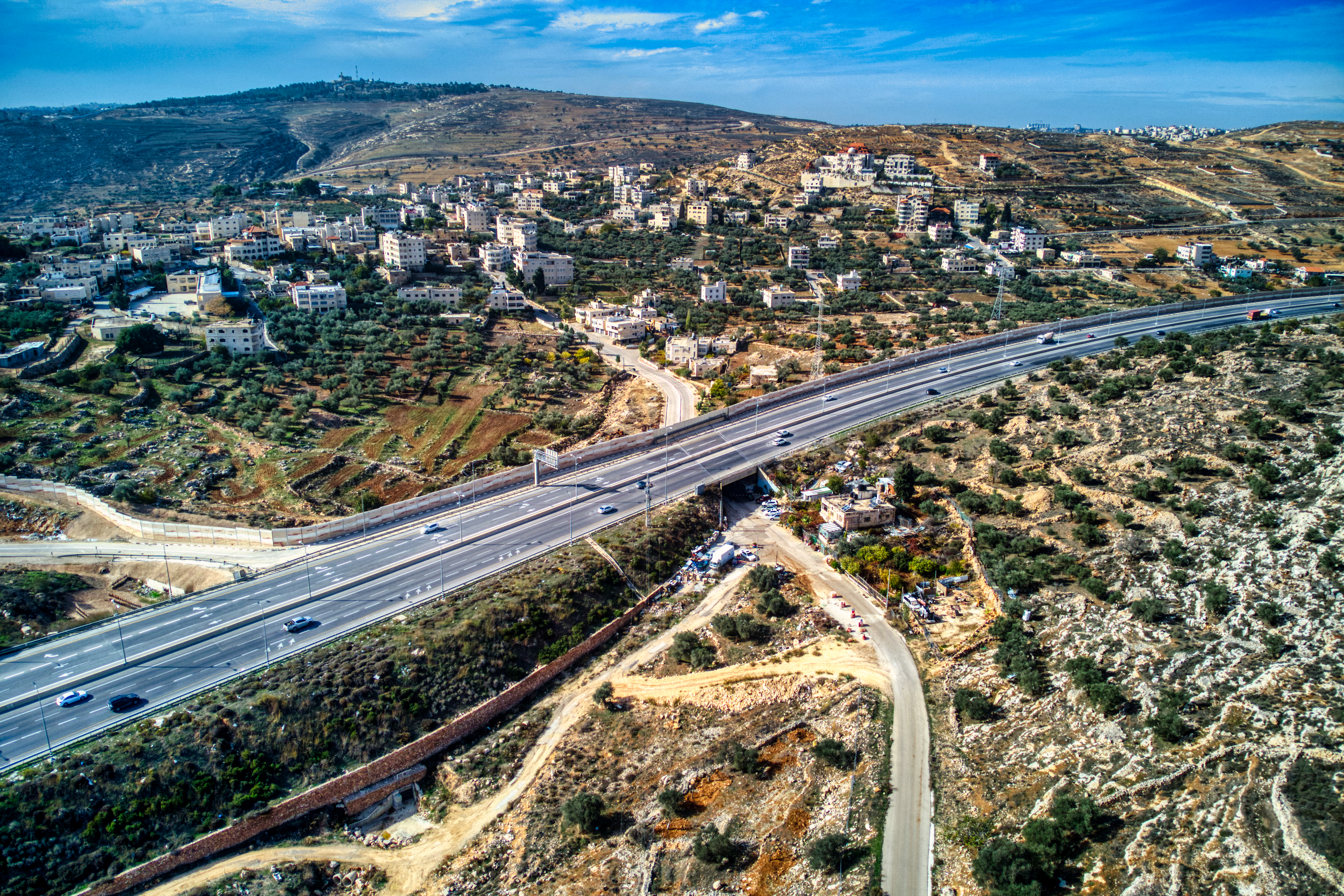
The old village of Beit Hanina separated from the new part of Beit Hanina by the separation barrier and Highway 50

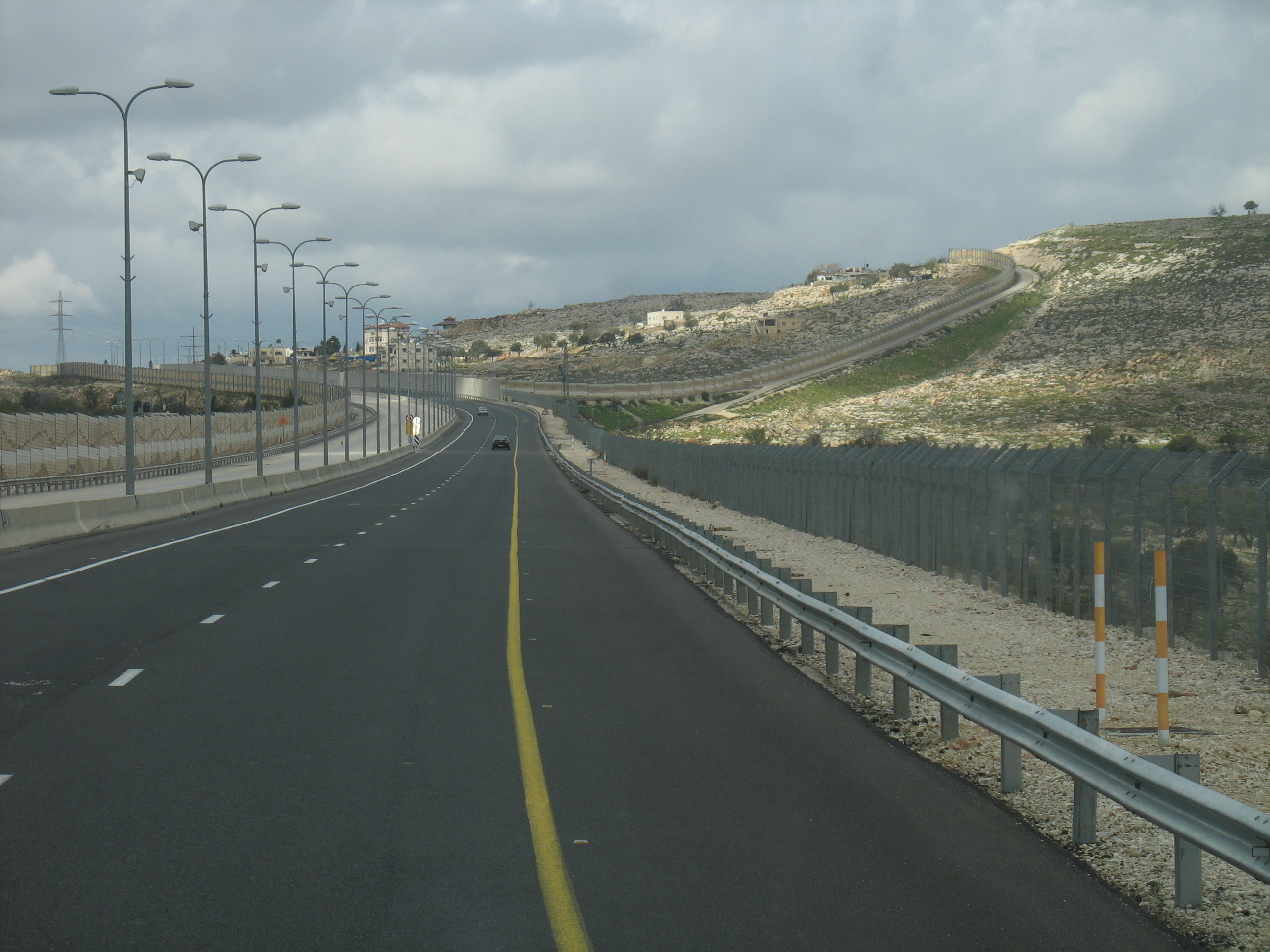
Northward approaching Atarot Junction
