= Highway 45 (Israel) =

Highway in Israel

Coordinates: 31°51′43.9″N 35°12′01.1″E

Highway 45
- כביש 45
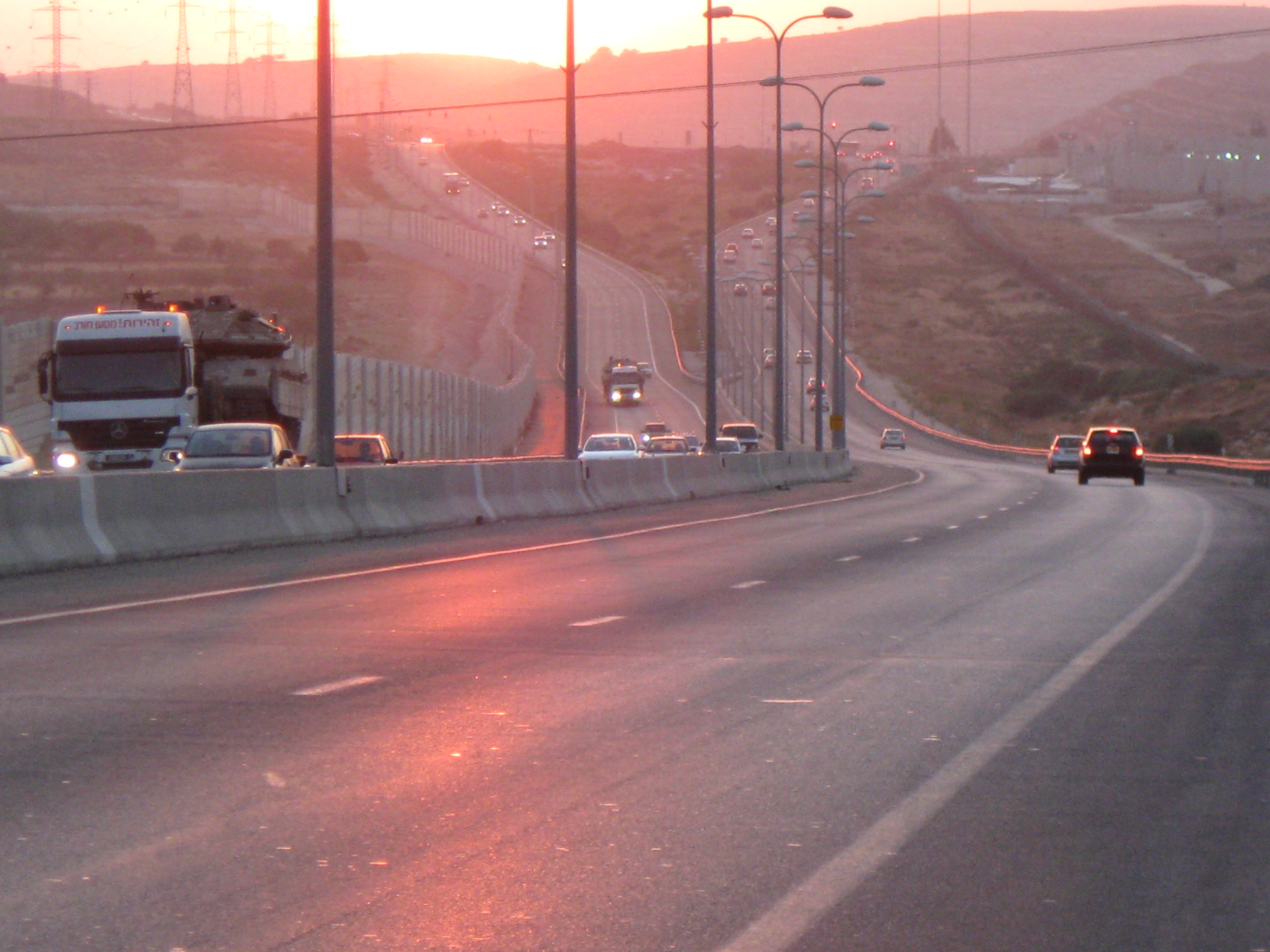
- Highway 45 westbound toward Givat Ze'ev Junction

Route information
- Length: 4.53 km (2.81 mi)

Major junctions
- West end: Giv'at Ze'ev Junction
- Atarot Junction; Atarot Industrial Park
- East end: Yehoshua Square

Location
- Country: Israel
- Major cities: Givat Ze'ev, Jerusalem

Highway system
- Roads in Israel; Highways
← Highway 44	→ Highway 46

Highway 45 is the official designation of a 3.3 km stretch of road forming a continuous connection between Route 443 from the Tel Aviv Metropolitan Area and Highway 50 (Begin Boulevard) to central Jerusalem and a 1.4 km spur serving the Atarot Industrial Park.

== Route ==
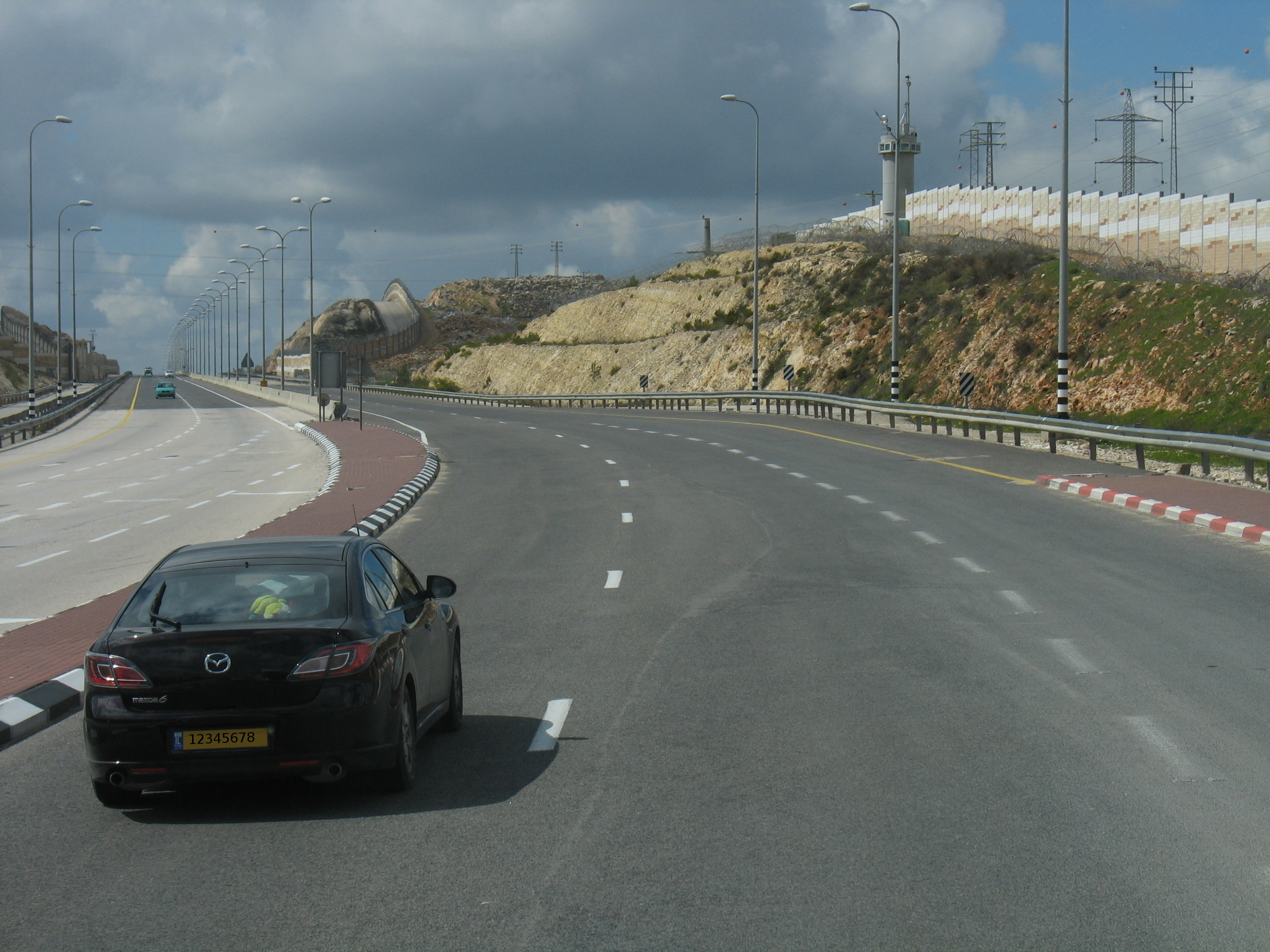
Highway 45 westbound from Atarot Junction

The road begins as a continuation of Route 443 at the traffic-light controlled Giv'at Ze'ev Junction. It runs east-southeast for 3.3 km as a high-speed four-lane divided highway. At the traffic-light controlled Atarot junction, it becomes Highway 50 (Begin Boulevard). The officially numbered "45" takes a 90-degree turn. Here, running northeast then east-northeast, it becomes a 2-lane local street running 0.8 km to the Atarot Industrial Zone and the closed entrance to Atarot Airport. After another 0.6 km the road as numbered ends at Airport Street. The road itself then continues an additional 0.6 km to Highway 60 adjacent to the Qalandia security checkpoint. However, this last section is no longer officially numbered 45.

== History ==
In the late 1990s, the Israel Ministry of Transport planned to construct Highway 45 from Highway 1 near Ben Gurion International Airport through the West Bank north of the Modi'im Stream passing slightly north of Beit Horon and Beit Ur al-Fauqa to the Atarot Industrial Park in Jerusalem. The current Route 443 just south of these towns as well as political considerations has made that plan irrelevant, leaving the small portion of Highway 45 between Giv'at Zeev and Atarot completed in 2003. Excavations in the hillsides performed in the 1990s can still be seen just northwest of Givat Ze'ev junction.

Furthermore, an easterly extension is still envisioned which would continue from Atarot and connect with Route 437 and the Eastern Ring Road. The construction of the West Bank security barrier along the right of way of Highway 45 east of Atarot and the Qalandia security checkpoint places limitations on that plan. A possible solution would involve tunnels and bridges. In 2017, the Israel Ministry of Transportation announced a five-year plan which includes just such an extension of this section with grade separation at the Qalandia Checkpoint. In the meantime, the completion of Jerusalem Road 20, 3.7 km further south, provides an alternate route to 437.

Further east, 45 is intended to eventually reach the border with Jordan north of the Dead Sea to connect with the road to Amman.

== Junctions and Interchanges (West to East) ==
District	Location	km	mi	Name	Destinations	Notes
Judea and Samaria	Giv'at Ze'ev	0.00	0.00	צומת גבעת זאב (Givat Ze'ev Junction)	Route 443; Route 436	
Jerusalem	Atarot	3.28	2.04	צומת עטרות (Atarot Junction)	Highway 50	
Jerusalem	Atarot Airport (closed)	4.02	2.50	כיכר עטרת (Atarot Square)	Atarot Street	
Jerusalem	Atarot	4.53	2.81	כיכר יהושע (Yehoshua Square)	Highway 60; Airport Street	
1.000 mi = 1.609 km; 1.000 km = 0.621 mi
