= Holyland Case =

Corruption case im Israel

Coordinates: 31.75717°N 35.18993°E

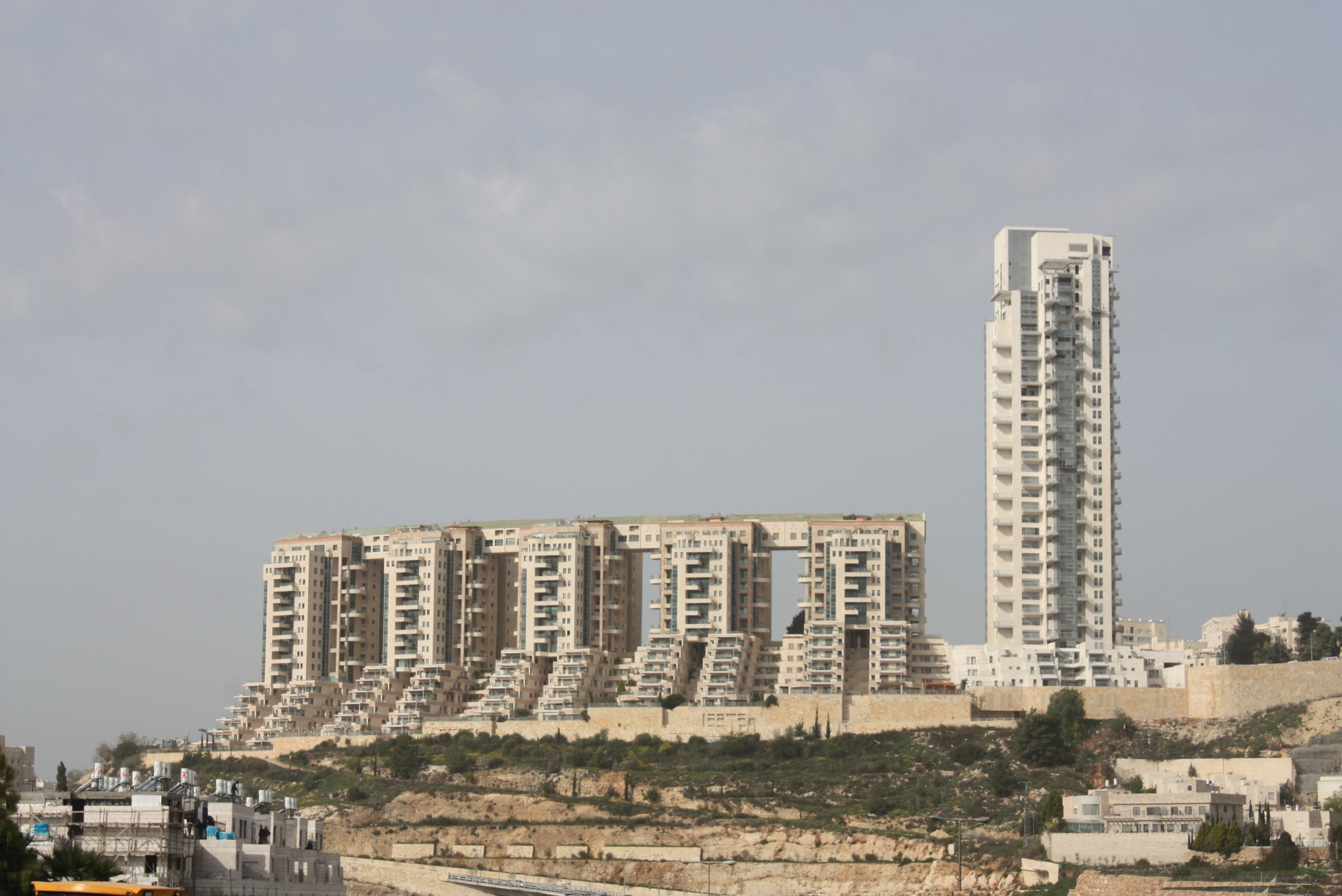
Holyland apartment complex, Jerusalem

The Holyland Case, named for the Holyland Park building complex in Jerusalem, was a high-profile corruption case in which top Israeli officials were charged with bribery and money laundering, among them former Israel Prime Minister Ehud Olmert and the former mayor of Jerusalem Uri Lupolianski. Of the 13 defendants, three were acquitted and ten, including Olmert, were found guilty.

== Holyland Park building complex ==
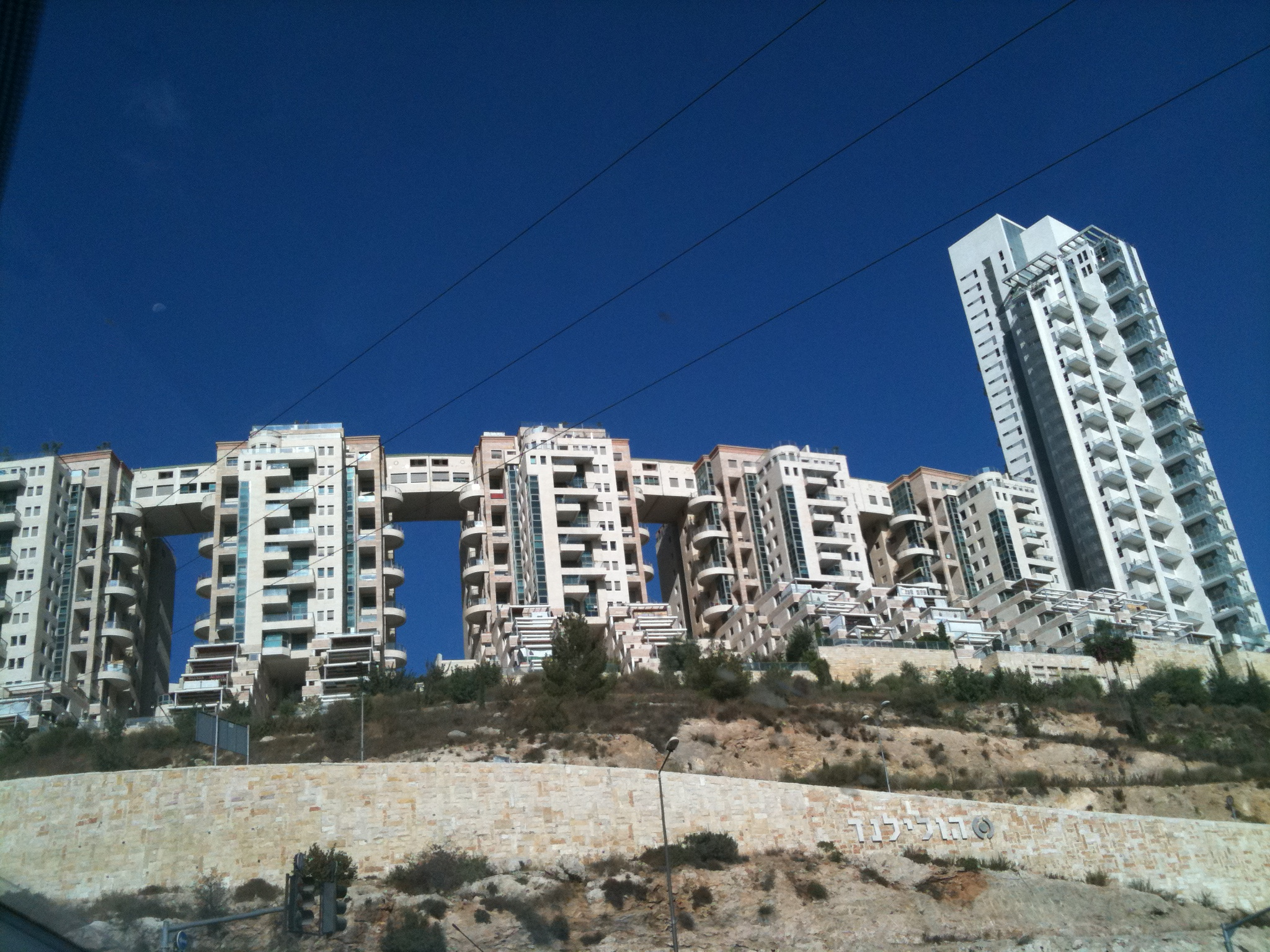
Holyland: Tower 1 (right), Park Towers (left)

Holyland Towers is a complex of luxury apartment buildings in Jerusalem, along Highway 50, 3.3 km (2.1 mi) South of the old city. The developer is Hillel Cherny (alt.: Hillel Cherney, Hillel Charney). Before construction began in 1995, it was the site of Holyland Hotel (Eretz Hatzvi Hotel) and the open-air Holyland Model of Jerusalem, now located on the grounds of the Israel Museum. When the old hotel was torn down, an archeological survey revealed a Bronze Age burial ground.

The initial plan was to replace the existing hotel with a larger one. This plan was later abandoned in favor of constructing residential housing, which required rezoning. It was the rezoning process that led to bribery charges.

The 60-dunam (60,000 m^{2}; 0.023 sq mi) plan includes a total of 1200 apartments. So far, one skyscraper and seven apartment towers have been built. Holyland Tower 1 (2009), a 121 m (397 ft) high building with 32 floors, is the highest building of Jerusalem. A similar Tower 2 is projected. In the same complex are Holyland Park Tower 1 to 7 (2004–2009), each 52 m (171 ft) tall with 15 floors. The Park Towers are connected by air bridges. The architecture is by Carmi Architects, Spector-Amisar, Tishby-Rozio Architects, and Moshe Zur Architects and Town Planners.

The buildings are visible from most places in the city. Critics have said they are ugly and intrude on the city's skyline.

== Early allegations ==
In 1996, the journalist Yoav Yitzchak claimed that Hillel Charney, the developer of the project, had obtained a false assessment of the value of the land, which had substantial tax benefits. Based on guidance from the Attorney General, a criminal investigation was launched against the Commissioner of Income Tax, Doron Levy, and his deputy Udi Barzilay. The police investigation did not result in prosecution, but forced Doron Levy to resign. A Disciplinary Committee by the Board of Valuers, which operates as a disciplinary court, opened proceedings against the assessors who were involved in the conspiracy. The two assessors were convicted.

In the summer of 2008, Yoav Yitzchak revealed additional suspicions of misconduct in the project, alleging that the developers had bribed the mayor of Jerusalem, Ehud Olmert. This was followed by a "draft statement of claim" prepared by businessman Schmuel Dachner, who was employed as a real estate consultant and broker by the Holyland project. He claimed not to have been paid him all his expenses and fees due to him, and because his demands were not answered he prepared a "draft statement of claim" against those involved in the case, and then contacted the police regarding the matter.

== Bribery investigation and indictment ==
This led to the opening of a police investigation. On April 6, 2010, five were arrested for suspected bribery: Hillel Charney; Meir Rabin, formerly employed by the Holyland project; Eliyahu Hasson, Holyland's accountant; Jerusalem city architect Uri Shitrit and Olmert's former partner and associate, attorney Uri Messer. A sixth suspect, Amram Benizri, was placed under house arrest. In February 2010 the prosecutor's office signed an agreement with Samuel Dachner, which awarded Dachner payment of "living wage" of 12000 shekels per month.

On January 5, 2012, the State Attorney's Office for the District Court in Tel Aviv filed an indictment against 17 defendants, on counts of giving or receiving bribes. The defendants included the prime minister and former mayor Ehud Olmert, Hillel Charney, and Avigdor Kellner, Danny Dankner the deputy chairman of Bank Hapoalim, Meir Rabin, who had worked as an assistant to Schmuel Dachner, Uri Shitrit, former mayor of Jerusalem Uri Lupolianski, Olmert's former Chief of Staff Shula Zaken, and Jacob Efrati, who headed the Israel Lands Administration. The prosecutors said that the corruption was not an isolated incident, but was part of established business practice, with bribery being used to subvert the planning process by changing zoning laws, overcoming opposition by citizens' groups and enabling violations of construction and pollution regulations.

== Trial ==
The evidence phase began on 1 July 2012 with the testimony of Schmuel Dachner that he had given money to Shula Zaken. Dachner died on March 1, 2013, several hours after he was cross-examined. Four days after his death his full name was revealed: (until then he was referred to by his initials, SD). Yossi Olmert, brother of Ehud Olmert, confirmed that Samuel Dachner gave him half a million. A few days before giving the verdict in the case, the State Attorney signed a plea bargain with Zaken, sentencing her to 11 months in prison in exchange for the delivery of evidence and incriminating evidence against Olmert.

On March 31, 2014, at the end of a trial involving 140 sessions held over two years, Tel Aviv District Court judge David Rosen convicted 10 of the 13 accused and acquitted Yaakov Efrati, the Israel Lands Administration, Amnon Safran and Shimon Galon, former executives at Holyland Park.

- Ehud Olmert was convicted of receiving NIS 560,000 ($160,000 US) in bribes. Olmert was acquitted of two other charges of bribery. The judge rejected Olmert's version of events, declaring that he had lied to the court. Sentence: 6–8 years in jail, and one million NIS fine.
- Shula Zaken was convicted of all charges of receiving bribes totaling hundreds of thousands of dollars as well as of money laundering, and was acquitted only of the count of receiving a bribe of ten thousand shekels. Sentence: 11–41 months in jail, fine 25 thousand NIS, 75 thousand NIS confiscated.
- Uri Lupolianski was convicted of accepting bribes totaling more than NIS 2 million.
- Avigdor Kelner, founder of "Holyland Park", was convicted of money laundering and giving bribery. Sentence: 3 years in jail, fine a million NIS and half a million confiscated.
- Hillel Charney, with the Holyland project, who hired Dachner to promote the project, was convicted of bribing Olmert, Shula Zaken and former mayor Uri Lupolianski and also of money laundering. Sentence: 3.5–5 years in jail, fine a million NIS, and a million confiscated.
- Meir Rabin, who was the principal assistant of witness Schmuel Dachner, was convicted of money laundering and bribery of 1.2 million NIS. Sentence: 5 years in jail.
- Uri Sheetrit, former Jerusalem city engineer, was convicted of accepting a bribe of NIS 130,000 from Dachner and money laundering.
- Danny Dankner was convicted of bribery, falsifying corporate documents and money laundering.
- Eliezer Simchayof, a former deputy mayor of Jerusalem, was convicted of accepting bribes from Dachner totaling NIS 165,000, and acquitted of accepting bribes totaling NIS 130,000.
- Avraham Feiner, a member of the Jerusalem City Council, was convicted of accepting a bribe of NIS 680,000.
- Hillel Cherney was sentenced to 3.5 years,
