= Highway 55 (Israel–Palestine) =

Road in Israel and the West Bank, Palestine

Coordinates: 32°10′54″N 35°02′39″E

Highway 55
- כביש 55
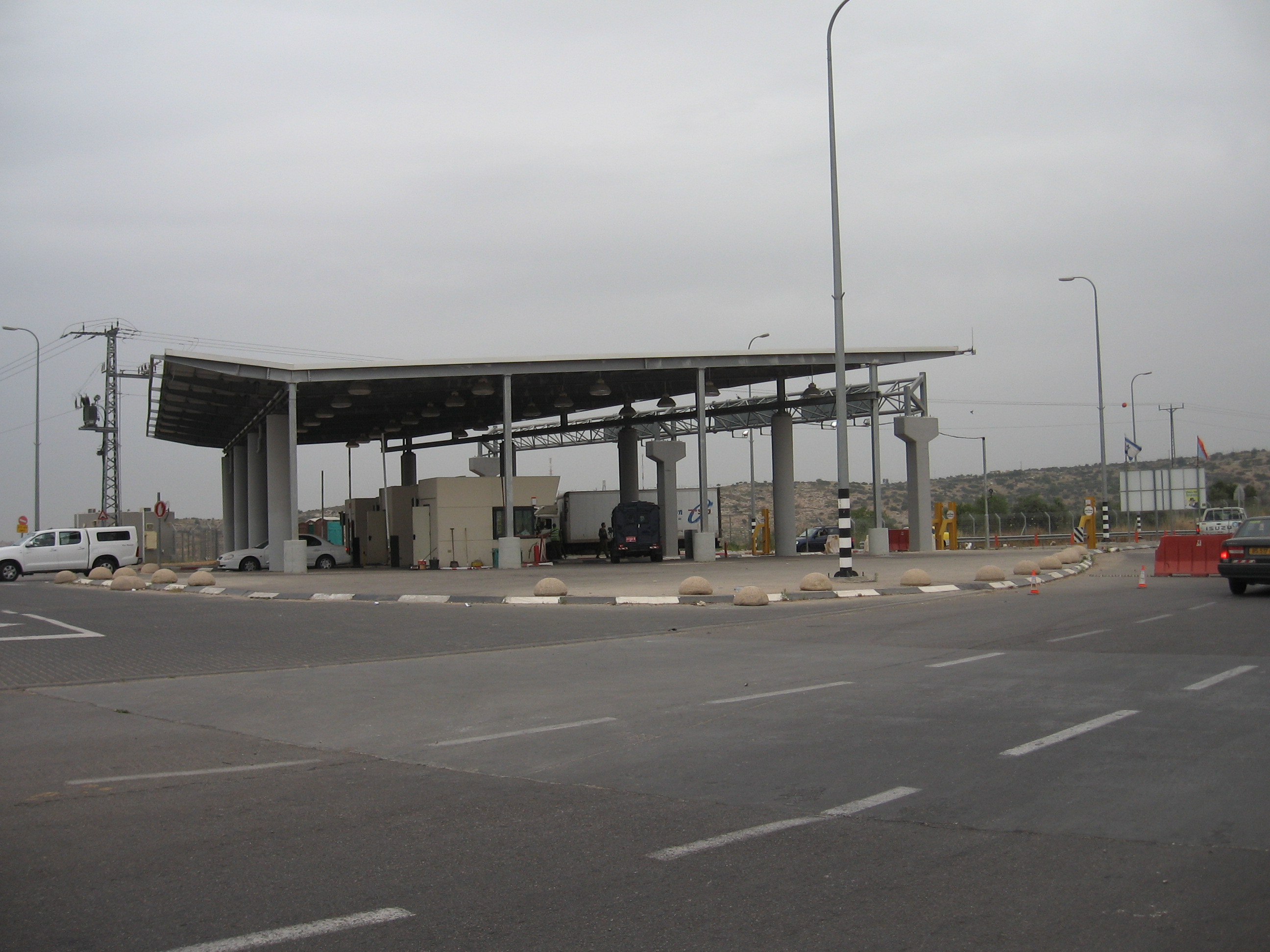
- Eliyahu Crossing

Route information
- Length: 25.5 km (15.8 mi)

Major junctions
- West end: East Kfar Saba Junction
- Atarot Junction Atarot Industrial Park
- East end: Jit Junction

Location
- Country: Israel
- Major cities: Givat Ze'ev, Jerusalem

Highway system
- Roads in Israel; Highways
← Highway 50	→ Highway 57

Highway 55 is a west–east highway running between Israel and the West Bank. Its Western terminus is in Kfar Saba, and it continues east to Nablus. Much of the road follows the eastern section of the "Aphek Ascent", an ancient east–west trade route connecting the Via Maris and the Way of the Patriarchs.

The road passes near Qalqilya, Alfei Menashe, Azzun, Jit, Karnei Shomron, and Kedumim, and ends in Nablus.

== History ==
After the First Intifada and the blocking of the road by Palestinians in the late 1980s and early 1990s, several bypass roads were built, south of Qalqilya and north of Azzun.

The Israeli military has blocked the majority of Palestinian access to Highway 55 in a few places. One is the road leading to Kafr Qaddum, which was closed to Palestinians during the Second Intifada due to its proximity to the Israeli settlement of Kedumim, effectively blocking Kafr Qaddum residents from accessing Nablus. Kafr Qaddum residents have held regular protests against the continuing closure since at least 2011. Another is Jaljulye Checkpoint, which is walled off from Palestine by the West Bank barrier.

== See also ==
- List of Israeli highways
- Transport in Palestine
