= Highway 46 (Israel) =

Highway in Israel

Coordinates: 32°00′34″N 34°55′01″E

Highway 46
- כביש 46
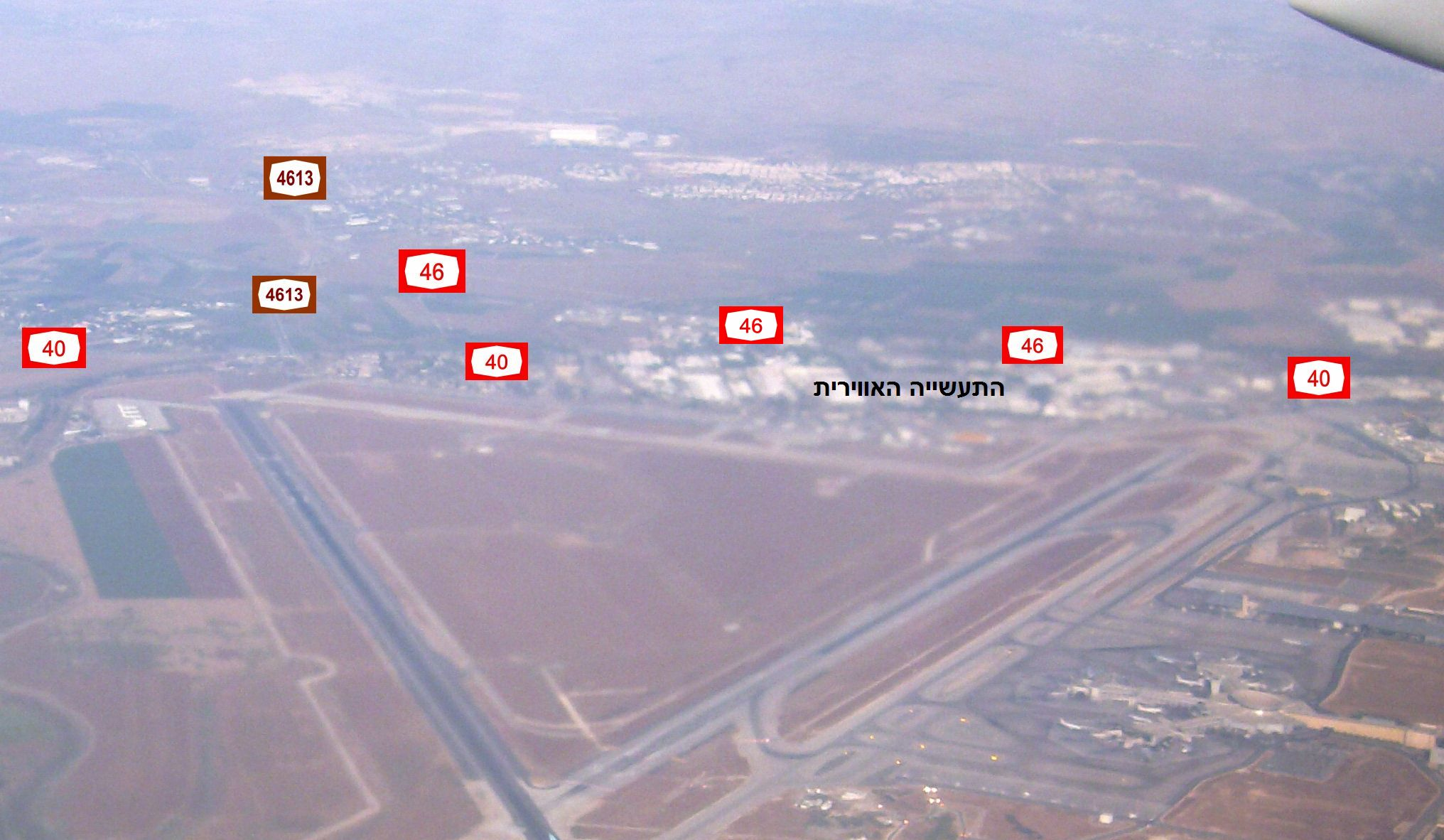
- Ben Gurion Airport with Route 46 in the background to the east

Route information
- Length: 3.67 km (2.28 mi)

Major junctions
- South end: El Al Junction
- North end: Bareket Junction

Location
- Country: Israel

Highway system
- Roads in Israel; Highways
← Highway 45	→ Highway 50

Highway 46 is a short highway in central Israel. The road, just 4 km long, was created to bypass the portion of Highway 40 that crosses the aviation industrial zone near Ben Gurion International Airport, a section of road that suffers from heavy traffic.

== Junctions & Interchanges (South to North) ==
District	Location	km	mi	Name	Destinations	Notes
Central	Ben Gurion International Airport	0.00	0.00	צומת אל על (El Al Junction)	Highway 40; Route 453; Road 4503	
Central	Tirat Yehuda	3.67	2.28	צומת ברקת (Bareket Junction)	Road 4613	
1.000 mi = 1.609 km; 1.000 km = 0.621 mi

== See also ==
- List of highways in Israel
