= Route 436 (Israel–Palestine) =

Road in Israel

Coordinates: 31°49′51.80″N 35°11′08.50″E

Route 436
- כביש 436
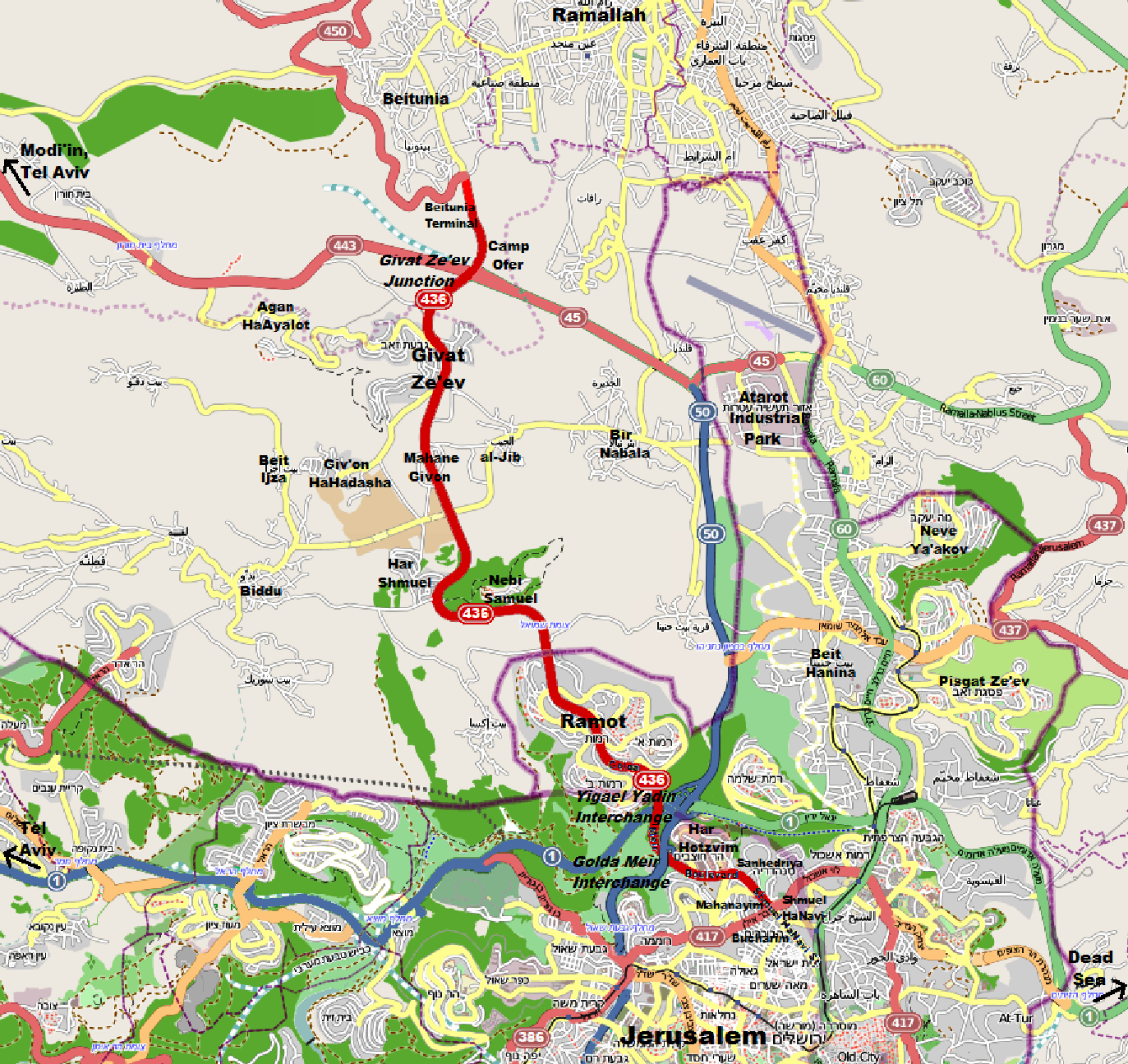

Route information
- Length: 13.2 km (8.2 mi)

Major junctions
- South end: Beit Hayyim Square
- Golda Meir Interchange; Yigael Yadin Interchange
- North end: Givat Ze'ev Junction

Location
- Country: Israel
- Major cities: Jerusalem (Mahanayim, Bukharim, Sanhedriya, Shmuel HaNavi & Ramot neighborhoods); Giv'on; Givat Ze'ev

Highway system
- Roads in Israel; Highways

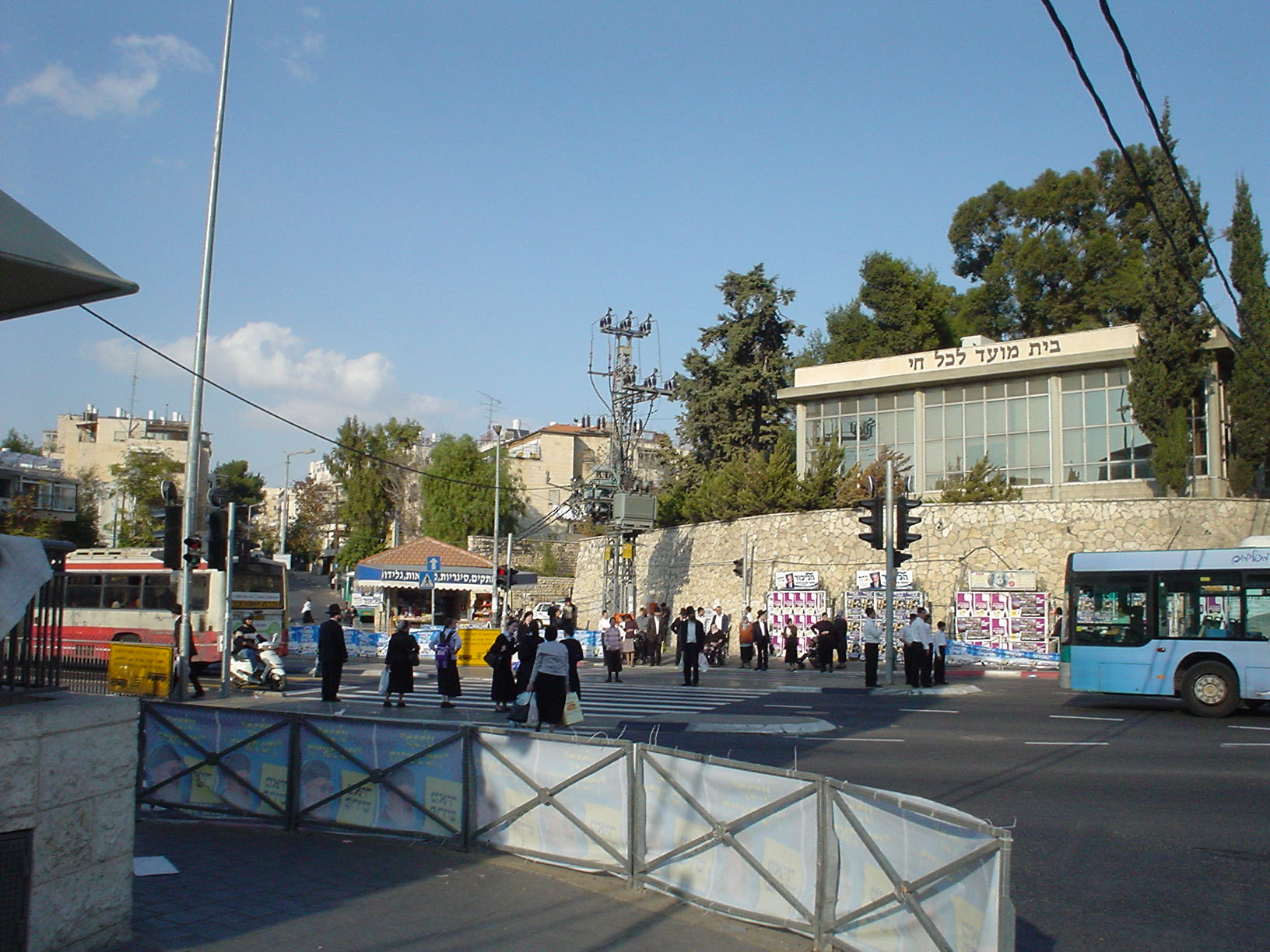
Beit HaHayyim Square

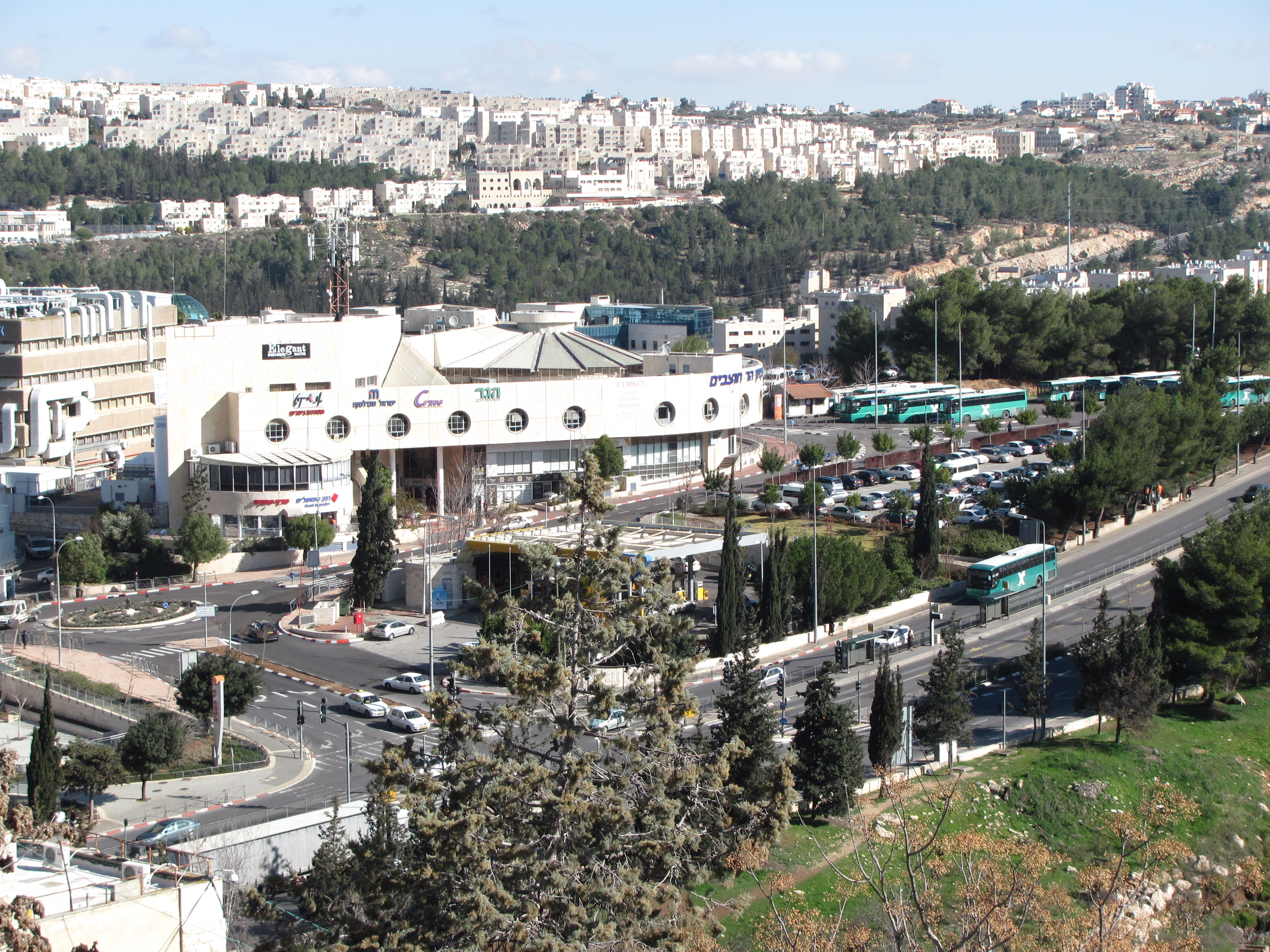
Har Hotzvim, 436 at bottom

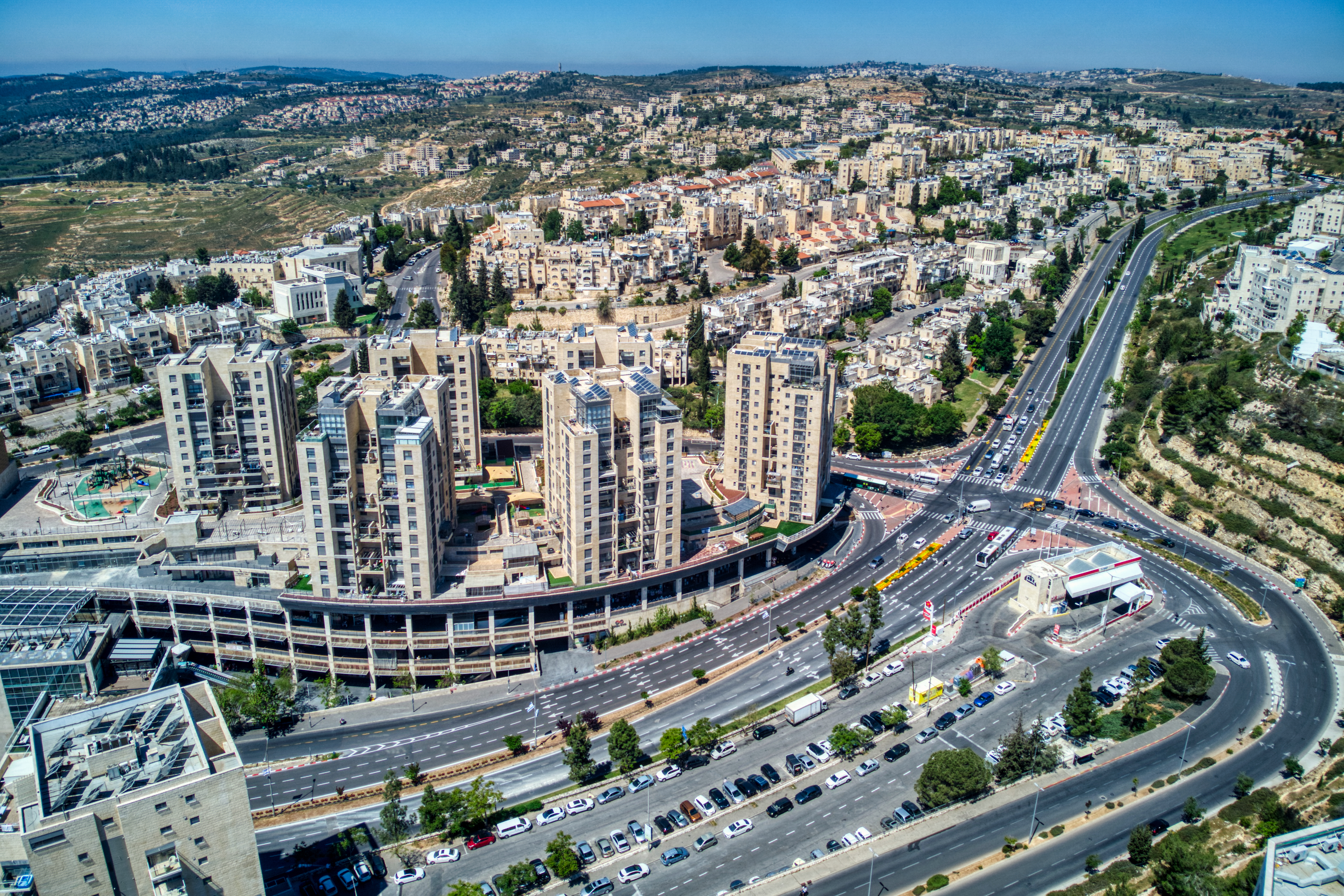
Ramot Mall on 436

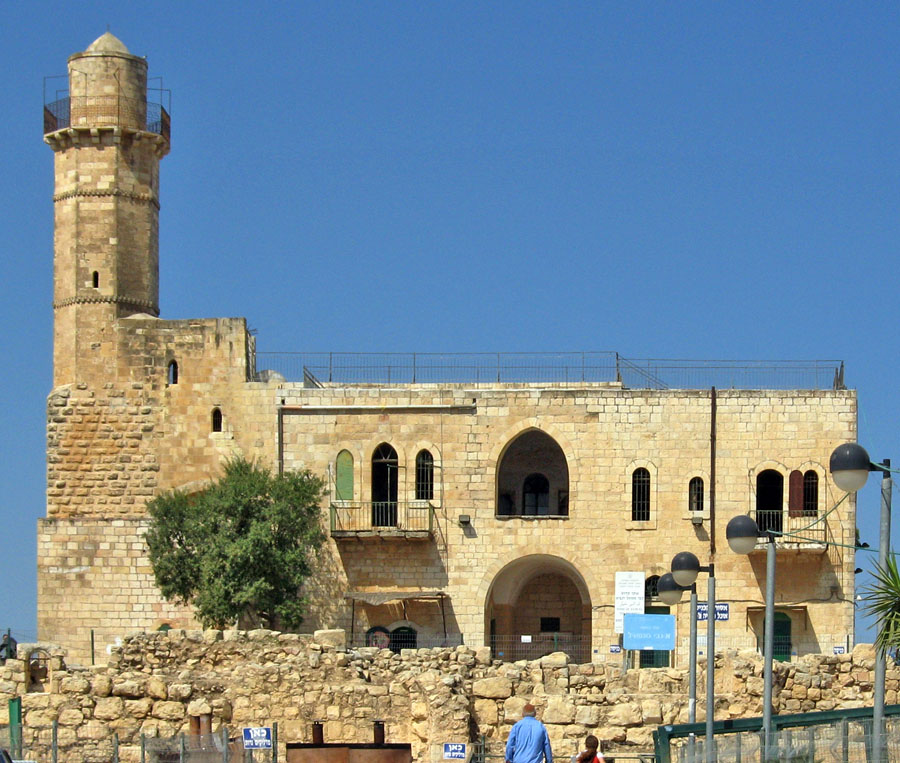
Nebi Samuel, a major tourist and pilgrimage site

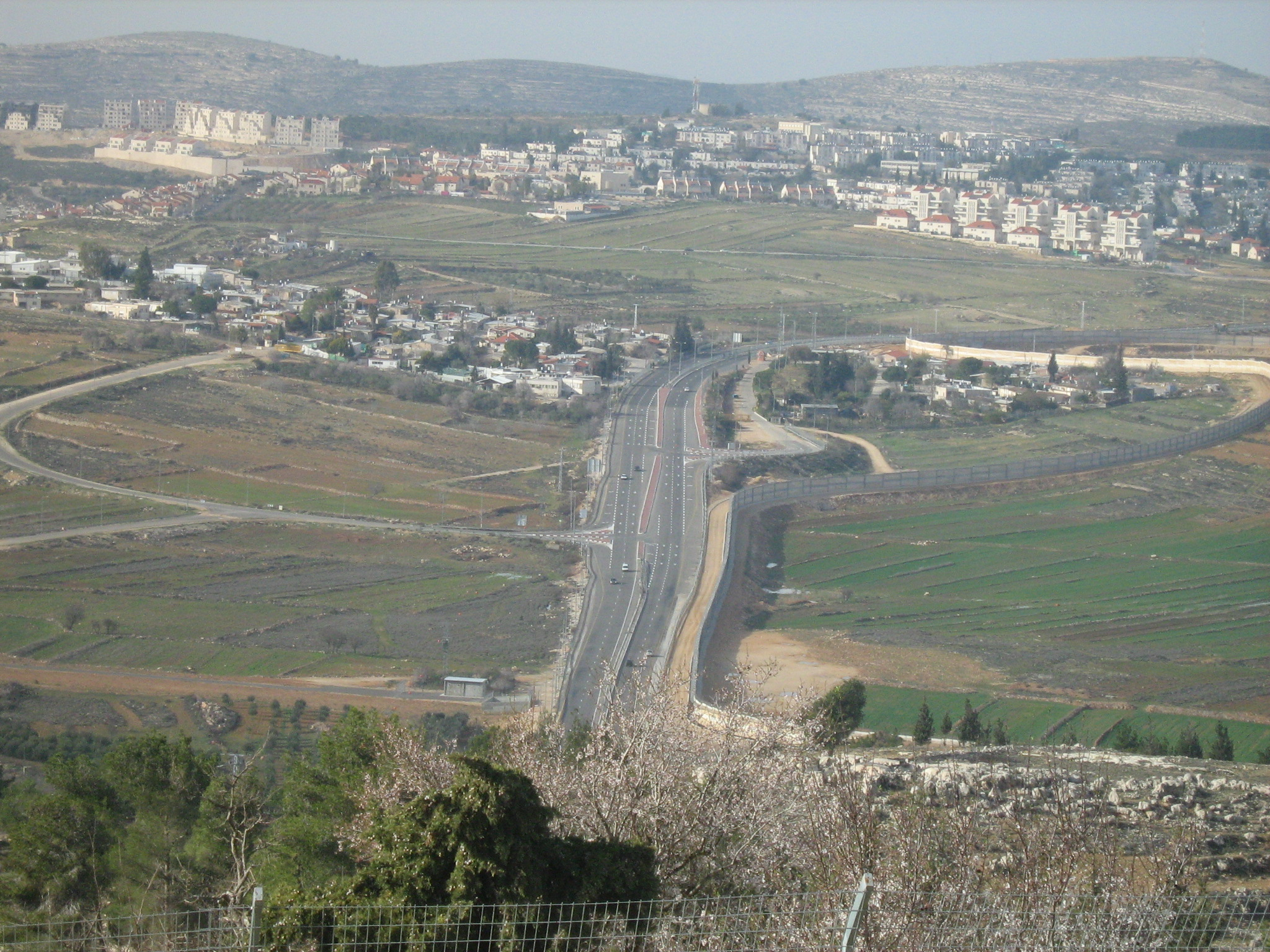
View northward toward Plain of Gibeon Mahane Givon at center, Givat Ze'ev at top

Route 436 is a regional arterial road in Israel and the West Bank between Jerusalem and Givat Ze'ev. The southern portion begins as a major urban artery in Jerusalem's predominantly Hareidi neighborhoods leading to Highway 50 (Begin Boulevard), to Highway 1 and to the northern neighborhood of Ramot. Further north, the road runs alongside portions of Israel's West Bank Barrier as it approaches Givat Ze'ev. It crosses Route 443 to the Tel Aviv area and Highway 45 to Atarot and ends at the Beitunia section of the security barrier. The speed limit begins at 50 kilometres per hour (31 mph) along its urban section becoming 70 kilometres per hour (43 mph) as it passes through Ramot and then becoming 90 km/h as it leaves the Jerusalem municipality northwards. The road officially ends at the Beitunya cargo transfer terminal.

== Route ==
The road begins at the heavily congested intersection of Route 417 (Bar-Ilan Street/Hativat HarEl Boulevard) and Shmuel HaNavi Street. The first 0.3 kilometres (0.19 mi) is called Shmuel HaNavi Street, a continuation of the street south of the intersection. At its beginning, 436 is a major transfer point for intra- and inter-city buses. It is six lanes wide with two lanes in each direction on either side for private vehicles and two public transportation lanes along its median. The bus lanes along the center of the road are envisioned to become part of the "Blue Line" of the Jerusalem Light Rail.

Just before Givat Moshe Junction, at 770 metres (2,530 ft) above sea level, the name of the road becomes Golda Meir Boulevard. It passes Jerusalem's largest high tech park, Har Hotzvim, while descending into Emek HaArazim (Valley of The Cedars) at 630 metres (2,070 ft). At Golda Meir Interchange, entrances in both directions provide access to Highway 50 (southbound). The road widens to eight lanes crossing the Sorek Stream and the Green Line at Yigael Yadin Interchange providing access to Highway 1 and Highway 50 (northbound). It then becomes six lanes and begins a steep ascent as the central artery through Ramot.

Leaving Ramot and the Jerusalem Municipality, the road becomes four lanes wide, passing the entrance to Nebi Samuel and reaching an altitude of 840 metres (2,760 ft). It then begins another descent to 725 metres (2,379 ft) in the Plain of Gibeon. Along this section, the road passes alongside the security barrier next to al-Jib. Passing Mahane Giv'on, the road rises to 770 metres (2,530 ft) as it passes through Givat Ze'ev. Further on, it descends to 740 metres (2,430 ft), intersecting with Routes 443 and 45. North of 443/45, the road provides entrances to Mahane Ofer and the Beitunia cargo transfer terminal, officially ending as numbered.

== Junctions (south to north) ==
| km | Name | Type | Meaning | Location | Road(s) Crossed |
|---|---|---|---|---|---|
↓Jerusalem Municipality↓
| 0 | ככר בית החיים (Beit HaHayyim Square) | | House of Life (name of adjacent municipal Funeral Home) | Bukharim, Shmuel HaNavi, Mahanayim, Sanhedriya | Route 417 (Bar Ilan St.) (Hativat HarEl St.), Shmuel HaNavi St. |
| 0.05 | | | | Mahanayim, Sanhedriya | Moshe Blau St. |
| 0.3 | צומת גבעת משה/גוש 80 (Givat Moshe/Gush 80 Junction) | | Moshe's Hill named after Moshe Porush | Ezrat Torah; Sanhedria Murhevet | HaAdmorim Leiner St., Givat Moshe St. |
| 0.8 | | | | Kiryat Sanz; Har Hotzvim | A.S. Artom St., Shefa Chayim St. |
| 1 | צומת הר חוצבים (Har Hotzvim Junction) | | Stonecutter's Hill | Har Hotzvim | Kiryat Mada St. |
| 1.2 | צומת NDS (NDS Junction) | | named after NDS; Jerusalem headquarters | Har Hotzvim | Shlomo (Momo) HaLevi St. |
| 1.7 | מחלף גולדה מאיר (Golda Meir Interchange) | | named after Golda Meir | Har Hotzvim | Highway 50 (Begin Boulevard) southbound |
| 2.2 | מחלף ידאל ידין (Yigael Yadin Interchange) | | named after Yigael Yadin | Ramot | Highway 1, Highway 50 (Begin Boulevard) northbound |
| 2.4 | Green Line | | | | |
| 3.1 | כיכר בנימין כהן (Binyamin Cohen Square) | | named after Benjamin Victor Cohen | Ramot; Neve Orot, Ramot Alon, Ramot Bet | Harry Truman St., Yigal Alon St. |
| 3.7 | כיכר ספימת מפקורה (Sfinat Mefkura Square) | | named after sunk refugee boat | Ramot | Shivat Zion St., Asirei Zion St. |
| 3.8 | | | | Ramot Mall | public transportation lanes, entrance to parking, deliveries |
| 4.2 | כיכר המלחין שוסטקוביץ (HaMalhin Shostakovich Square) | | named after Dmitri Shostakovich | Ramot; Ramot Polin, Ramot Gimel, Ramot Daled | HaRoeh St, HaKongres HaTzioni St. |
| 4.7 | כיכר הרב אלעזר (HaRav Elazar Square) | | named after Yehuda Elazar | Ramot | Avraham Recanati St., Yitzhak Mirsky St. |
| 5.2 | | | | Ramot | Binyamin Mintz St., HaMeshorer Etzeg St. |
↑Jerusalem Municipality↑
| 5.3 | צומת שמואל (Shmu'el Junction) | | named after nearby Nebi Samu'el | former location of security checkpoint | local road |
| 6.2 | | | | Nebi Samuel | entrance road |
| 7.2 | | | | Har Shmuel | entrance road, ( entry to Biddu closed) |
| 8.9 | | | | Mahane Givon (West) | entrance road |
| 9.1 | (northbound only) | | | Mahane Givon (East) | entrance road |
| 10.2 | | | | Giv'on HaHadasha, Givat Ze'ev | entrance road |
| 10.4 | צומת גבעונים (Giv'onim Junction) | | named after ancient Gibeonites | filling station | entrance road, ( entry to al-Jib & Bir Nabala closed) |
| 11 | | | | Givat Ze'ev | HaMaccabim St., Kidron St. |
| 12.2 | צומת גבעת זאב (Givat Ze'ev Junction) | | Wolf Hill | Giv'at Ze'ev; Ofer Prison | Route 443, Highway 45 |
| 12.3 | | | | Beitunia Terminal | entrance to cargo transfer station |
| 12.4 | | | | Ofer Prison | entrance to Ofer Prison |
| 13.2 | | | | Beitunia | Security Barrier |
↑NO southbound through-traffic for green (Palestinian) license plates↑

== See also ==
- List of highways in Israel
