= Ramot Mall =

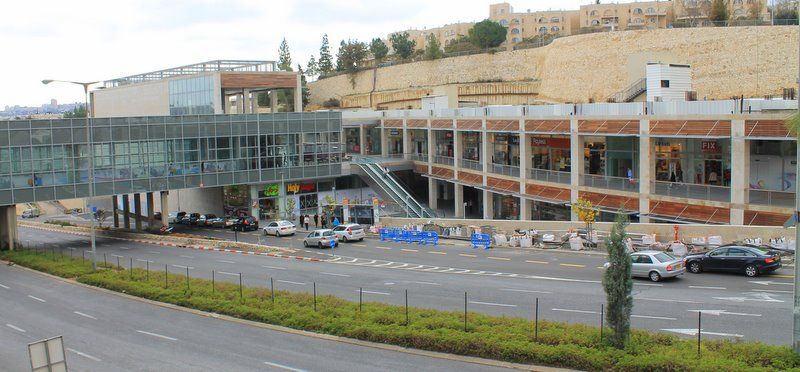
- View of Ramot Mall from Golda Meir Boulevard
- Location: Ramot, Jerusalem
- Coordinates: 31°49′4.14″N 35°11′40.08″E
- Opened: September 2011
- Owner: Phoenix Holdings Ltd. Bayit Chadash BeYerushalaim Ltd.
- Floor area: 22,000 square metres (240,000 sq ft)
- Floors: 3
- Parking: 650 spaces
- Website: www.ramot-mall.co.il

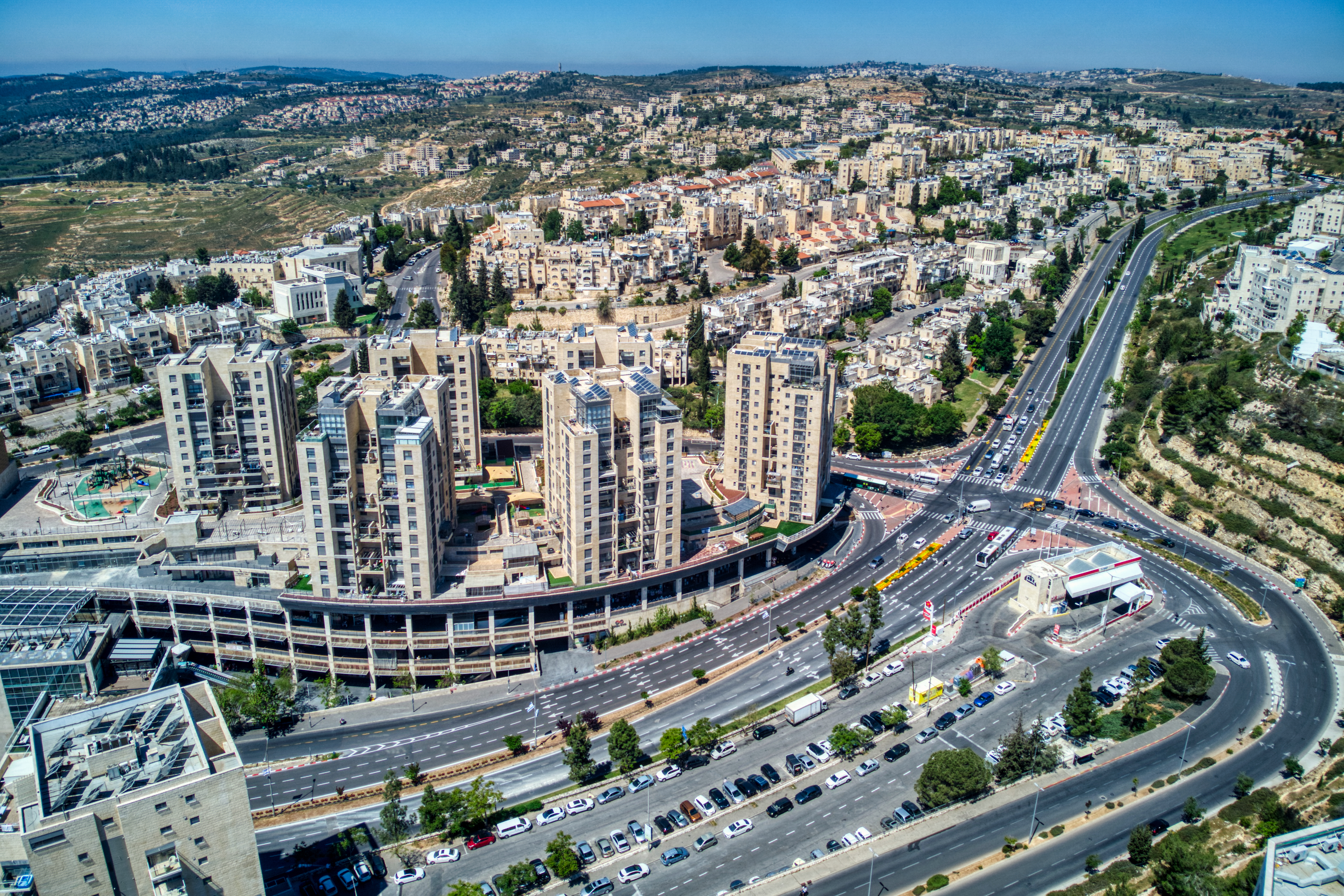
Golda Meir Boulevard and Ramot Mall

Ramot Mall (Hebrew: קניון רמות, Kenyon Ramot) is an indoor/outdoor shopping mall in Ramot, a neighborhood or Israeli settlement in northwest East Jerusalem. Opened in September 2011, it is the second-largest shopping center in Jerusalem (after Malha Mall).

== Location ==
Ramot Mall is located on Golda Meir Boulevard at the corner of HaCongress HaTsiyoni. The site, close to the northwestern tip of Jerusalem, is heavily trafficked by automobiles accessing the city via Highway 1 and Route 443. Approximately 42,000 cars pass by the site each day, and 300,000 people live within a 10-minute drive of the mall.

== Description ==
Ramot Mall is a three-level shopping center with 22,000 square metres (240,000 sq ft) of floor space, along with three levels of indoor parking and an open parking lot that accommodate a total of 650 cars. It was designed by architect Naama Malis, who also designed malls in Giv'atayim and Kfar Saba. Ramot Mall is owned by Phoenix Holdings Ltd. of the Tshuva Group (70%) and Bayit Chadash Beyerushalaim Ltd. (30%).

The facility is closed on Shabbat.

It features a mix of outlet shops typical of most Israeli shopping malls, including The Children's Place, Super-Pharm, FOX, Crocs, Lord Kitsch, Shuk Ha'ir Supermarket, Eden-Teva Natural Food Market, and Israel Discount Bank. Unlike other shopping malls, it operates in a predominantly Haredi area, even as it woos secular and religious clientele from outlying locales such as Giv'at Ze'ev, Pisgat Ze'ev, French Hill, and Ma'ale Adumim. Even before its opening, observers predicted that the mall would have to walk a "tightrope" to appeal to both secular and Haredi consumers. All eateries in the mall carry Mehadrin hechsherim (kashrut certification),.

Rav Kav has a service location in Ramot Mall.

There are medical and dental offices at the mall, including from Israeli Health maintenance organizations such as Maccabi Healthcare Services and Kupat Holim Meuhedet.

== Hareidi boycott ==
In May 2013 a group of 14 Haredi rabbis from the Ramot area called on religious shoppers to boycott most of the mall's stores and visit the site "only when necessary", such as to access the bank or pharmacy. The rabbis stated that the stores had not honored earlier agreements to abide by modesty standards for store displays, type of merchandise being sold, piped-in music, and children's activities being held during holiday seasons. Several stores reported a downturn in sales as a result of the boycott.

By July 2013, mall operators were reported to be meeting with local rabbis, with the assistance of "senior City Hall mayoral advisors", in an effort to meet the rabbis' demands and end the boycott.

== See also ==
- List of shopping malls in Israel
