= List of highways numbered 55 =

The following highways are numbered 55:

== International ==
- E55 European route E55
- Arab Mashreq route M55

== Argentina ==
- San Luis Provincial Route 55

== Australia ==
- Carnarvon Highway
- Castlereagh Highway
- Karoonda Highway

== Belgium ==
- N55 road (Belgium)

== Canada ==
- Alberta Highway 55
- Saskatchewan Highway 55
- Quebec Autoroute 55

== China ==
- G55 Expressway

== Croatia ==
- D55 road (Croatia)

== Czech Republic ==
- D55 motorway

== Finland ==
- Finnish national road 55

== France ==
- A55 autoroute
- N55 road (France)

== Germany ==
- Bundesstraße 55

== Greece ==
- EO55 road

== India ==
- NH 55

== Iran ==
- Road 55

== Ireland ==
- N55 road (Ireland)

== Israel ==
- Highway 55 (Israel)

== Italy ==
- Autostrada A55

== Japan ==
- Japan National Route 55

== Jordan ==
- Highway 55

== Pakistan ==
- National Highway 55

== Korea, South ==
- Jungang Expressway
- Gukjido 55

== Mexico ==
- Mexican Federal Highway 55

== Philippines ==
- N55 highway (Philippines)

== Russia ==
- Baikal Highway (Former Number, Now renamed R2580)

== South Africa ==
- R55 route

== United Kingdom ==
- British A55 (Holyhead-Chester)
- British M55 (Fulwood-Blackpool)
- A55 road (Northern Ireland)

== United States ==
- Interstate 55
- U.S. Route 55 (former)
  - U.S. Route 55 (Arizona-Wisconsin) (former proposal)
- Alabama State Route 55
  - County Route 55 (Lee County, Alabama)
- Arkansas Highway 55 (1926-1958) (former)
- California State Route 55
- Colorado State Highway 55
- Connecticut Route 55
- Florida State Road 55
- Georgia State Route 55
- Idaho State Highway 55
- Illinois Route 55 (former)
- Indiana State Road 55
- Iowa Highway 55 (former)
- K-55 (Kansas highway)
- Kentucky Route 55
- Louisiana Highway 55
  - Louisiana State Route 55 (former)
- Maryland Route 55
- M-55 (Michigan highway)
- Minnesota State Highway 55
  - County Road 55 (Beltrami County, Minnesota)
  - County Road 55 (Chisago County, Minnesota)
- Mississippi Highway 55 (former)
- Missouri Route 55 (1922) (former)
- Montana Highway 55
- Nebraska Highway 55 (former)
  - Nebraska Link 55K
  - Nebraska Link 55W
  - Nebraska Link 55X
  - Nebraska Spur 55B
  - Nebraska Spur 55C
  - Nebraska Spur 55D
  - Nebraska Spur 55E
  - Nebraska Spur 55F
  - Nebraska Spur 55G
  - Nebraska Spur 55H
  - Nebraska Spur 55J
  - Nebraska Spur 55M
  - Nebraska Recreation Road 55N
  - Nebraska Recreation Road 55P
  - Nebraska Recreation Road 55R
  - Nebraska Recreation Road 55T
  - Nebraska Recreation Road 55U
  - Nebraska Recreation Road 55V
- Nevada State Route 55 (former)
- New Jersey Route 55
  - County Route 55 (Bergen County, New Jersey)
  - County Route 55 (Monmouth County, New Jersey)
- New Mexico State Road 55
- New York State Route 55
  - County Route 55 (Cattaraugus County, New York)
  - County Route 55 (Chemung County, New York)
  - County Route 55 (Dutchess County, New York)
  - County Route 55 (Franklin County, New York)
  - County Route 55 (Herkimer County, New York)
  - County Route 55 (Lewis County, New York)
  - County Route 55 (Madison County, New York)
  - County Route 55 (Niagara County, New York)
  - County Route 55 (Onondaga County, New York)
  - County Route 55 (Orange County, New York)
  - County Route 55 (Oswego County, New York)
  - County Route 55 (Otsego County, New York)
  - County Route 55 (Putnam County, New York)
  - County Route 55 (Rensselaer County, New York)
  - County Route 55 (Saratoga County, New York)
  - County Route 55 (Schoharie County, New York)
  - County Route 55 (St. Lawrence County, New York)
  - County Route 55 (Steuben County, New York)
  - County Route 55 (Suffolk County, New York)
  - County Route 55 (Sullivan County, New York)
  - County Route 55 (Warren County, New York)
- North Carolina Highway 55
- Ohio State Route 55
- Oklahoma State Highway 55
- Pennsylvania Route 55 (former)
- South Carolina Highway 55
- South Dakota Highway 55 (former)
- Tennessee State Route 55
- Texas State Highway 55
  - Farm to Market Road 55 (Texas)
  - Texas Park Road 55
- Utah State Route 55
- Virginia State Route 55
- West Virginia Route 55
- Wisconsin Highway 55

== Vietnam ==
- National Road 55 (Vietnam)

== See also ==
- List of highways numbered 55A
- A55 roads
- National Maximum Speed Law, a United States law setting the speed limit at 55 miles per hour (89 km/h)
- Hwy 55 Burgers, Shakes & Fries, a United States-based restaurant chain named after North Carolina Highway 55

Preceded by 54	Lists of highways 55	Succeeded by 56
