= Ramot, East Jerusalem =

Israeli settlement in East Jerusalem

Coordinates: 31°48′43″N 35°12′0″E

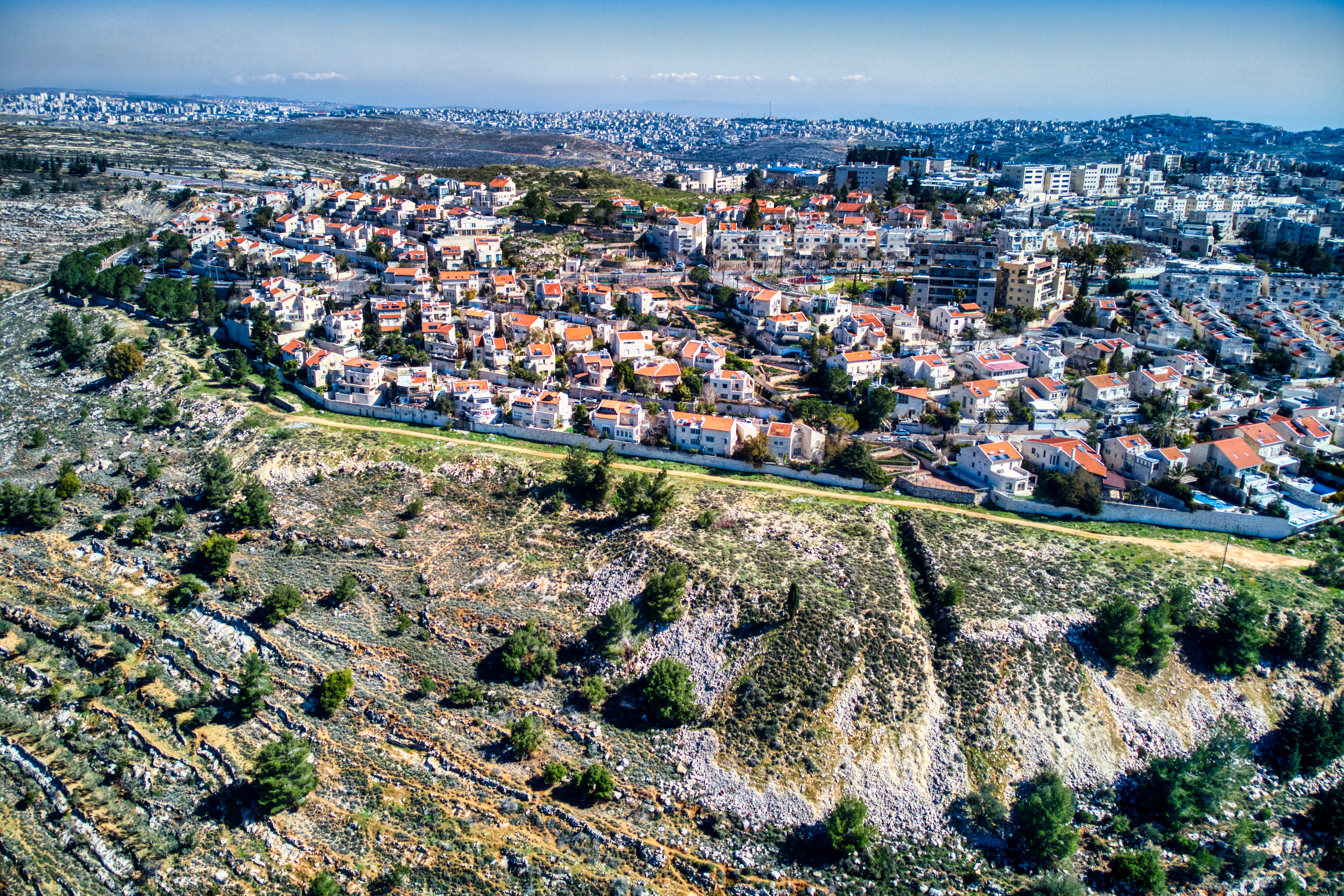
Aerial view of Ramot.

Ramot (Hebrew: רָמוֹת, lit. 'Heights'), also known as Ramot Alon (Hebrew: רמות אלון), is an Israeli settlement and neighborhood in East Jerusalem. Ramot was founded in 1974 as one of Jerusalem's so-called "Ring settlements", considered illegal under international law. In 2020, Ramot had a population of 50,400 of which 75% consists of Haredi Jews.

== History ==
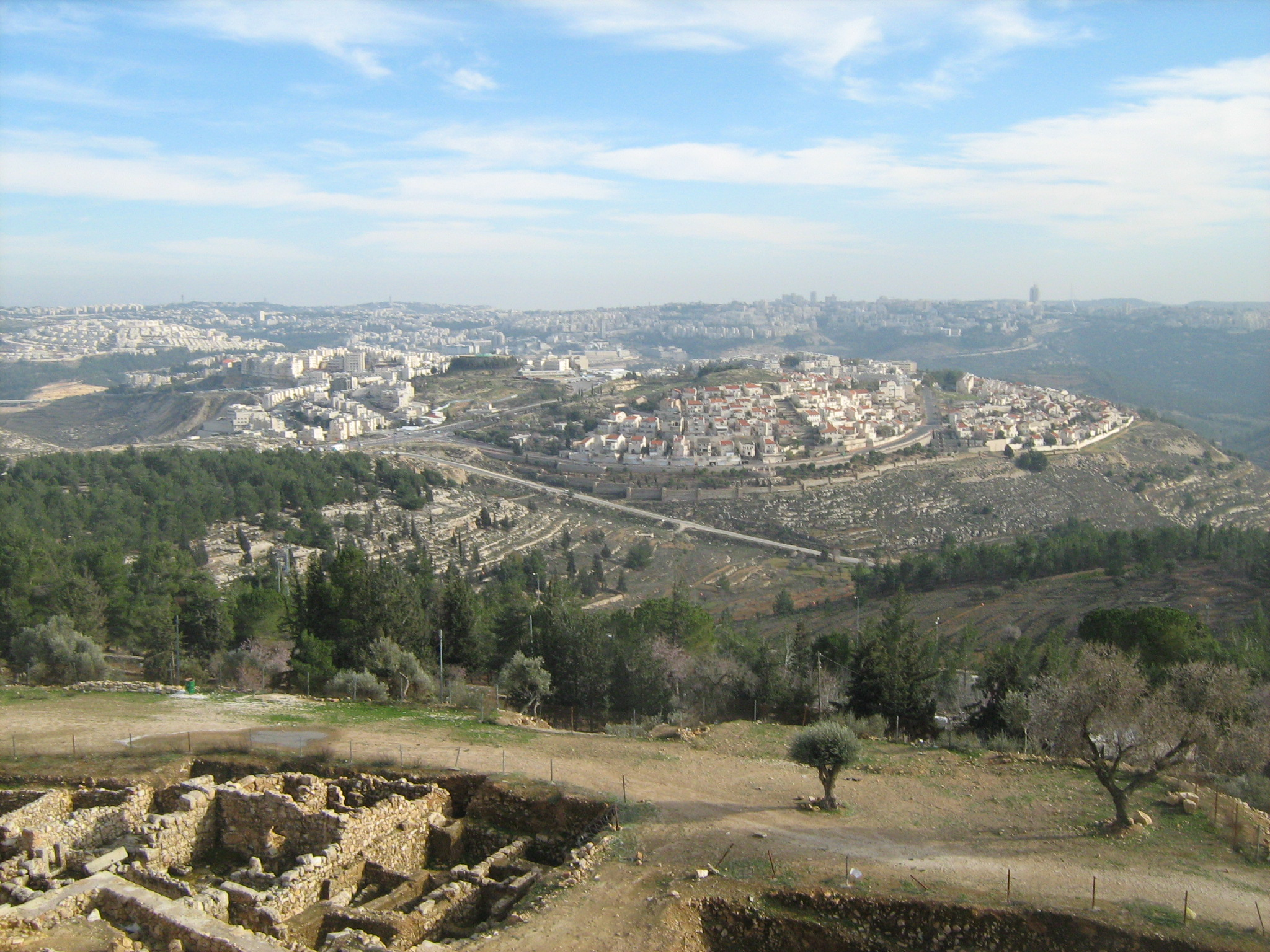
View of Ramot from the Tomb of Samuel. Part of the ruins are visible in the bottom left.

Ramot is named after the biblical city of Rama(h), where the Prophet Samuel lived and was brought for burial: Now Samuel had died, and all Israel lamented him, and buried him in Ramah, and (each one lamented him) in his own city. (Samuel I, 28:3). One tradition associates biblical Rama with one of the highest peaks of the Judean Hills, reaching 885 meters above sea level. The Tomb of Samuel is located 1.3 kilometers north of Ramot, on the lands of the Arab village Nabi Samwil, which has been moved further down the hill but whose mosque is still active in the structure above the tomb.

Between the 1949 Armistice Agreements and the Six-Day War in 1967, most of the area that is today Ramot was under Jordanian control. Ramot was established in 1974. After the death of Yigal Allon, Israeli military and political figure, the neighborhood was officially renamed Ramot Alon, "Alon Heights".

== Geography ==
Ramot is north and west of the center of Jerusalem. The neighborhood is built upon two elongated ridges about 100–200 meters above the surrounding landscape (heights of 693–850 meters above sea level). Between the ridges is the Golda Meir highway, leading to Tel Aviv. Travel time to the center of Jerusalem is about 15 minutes, and to Har Hotzvim industrial park about 7 minutes. The Jerusalem light rail system will be expanded to include Ramot.

== Demography ==
In 2020, Ramot had a population of 50,400. Ramot Alon exemplifies the demographic change in Jerusalem. When it was established in 1974, the population was 70% secular. Since 2000, Ramot Alef, Gimel and Daled have become partially Haredi (also spelled Chareidi), and the percentage of Orthodox Jews in all of Ramot Alon has risen to 75%.

One side of Ramot Gimel is mostly Haredi, and the other side is more Modern Orthodox. Ramot Vav also contains a Haredi population. In all of Ramot there is a mix of other types of residents including Dati Leumi, Modern Orthodox, and Chardal. There are a few Chabad synagogues as well.

== Legal status ==
Ramot was built on land expropriated from Palestinian landowners in 1970. According to ARIJ, Israel confiscated land from two nearby Palestinian villages:

- 1,530 dunams from Beit Iksa,
- 134 dunams from Beit Hanina.

Ramot is administered by Israel as part of the Jerusalem municipality. However, since part of the neighborhood has been built across the Green Line in East Jerusalem, the international community considers Ramot to be an Israeli settlement. Israel unilaterally annexed East Jerusalem and maintains that developments in East Jerusalem are not settlements, but the move was condemned by the UN Security Council as "null and void" and was not recognized by the international community. The international community considers Israeli settlements to be illegal under international law, violating the Fourth Geneva Convention's prohibition on the transfer of a civilian population into territory held under military occupation, but Israel considers East Jerusalem its sovereign territory. The U.S. government, as the rest of the international community, refers to Israeli neighborhoods in East Jerusalem as "settlements" and Israeli Jews living in East Jerusalem, including in Ramot, as "settlers".

The United States Department of State, European Union and the Palestinians described the plans to build 800 new homes in West Bank settlements and 600 in East Jerusalem, including 294 in Ramot, as harmful to the peace process. Spokesperson for the U.S. State Department, Jen Psaki, said "We consider now and have always considered the settlements to be illegitimate". Catherine Ashton, the EU foreign policy chief, said "the settlements are illegal under international law, constitute an obstacle to peace and threaten to make the two-state solution impossible". Saeb Erekat, chief negotiator for the PLO, said the announcement "shows Israel's clear commitment to the destruction of peace efforts" and that international community should "sever all ties with the Israeli occupation ... [to] ... protect and help to realize the two-state solution".

In the context of the Israeli–Palestinian peace process, the Clinton Parameters and Geneva accords proposed keeping Ramot (and other Jewish neighborhoods in Jerusalem beyond the green line) under Israeli sovereignty, possibly in exchange for other land.

== Architecture ==
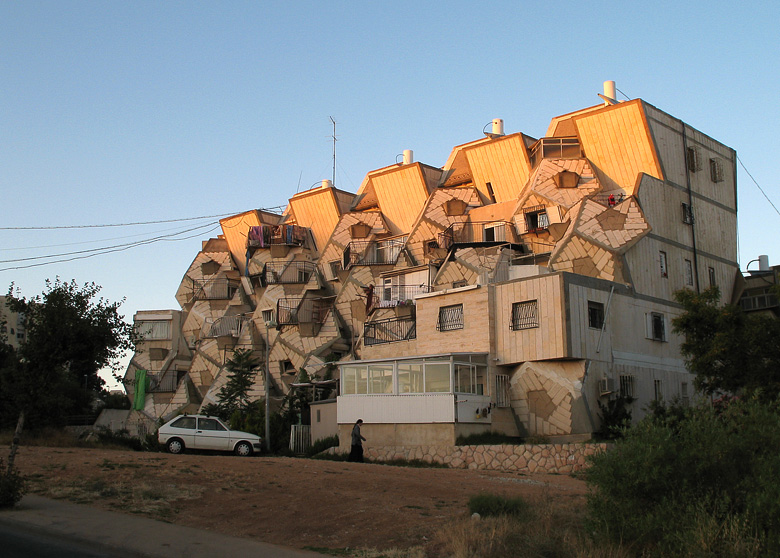
The once modernist 'Ramot Polin Apartments', designed by Zvi Hecker, which has generated much controversy among Israeli architects.

Buildings clustered around courtyards was a predominant architectural style in Ramot in the 1980s. Large, well-kept private homes were constructed in the 1970s and 1980s under the Build Your Own Home project, reflecting the rising standards of living in Israel and a change in consumer habits. Ramot Polin Apartments, designed by Zvi Hecker, have been named as one of the "World's Strangest Buildings" and has been described as a "housing project for honeybees". The entire neighborhood is organized upon a hill in central Ramot in a shape resembling a five-fingered hand or three-branched leaf.

== Education ==
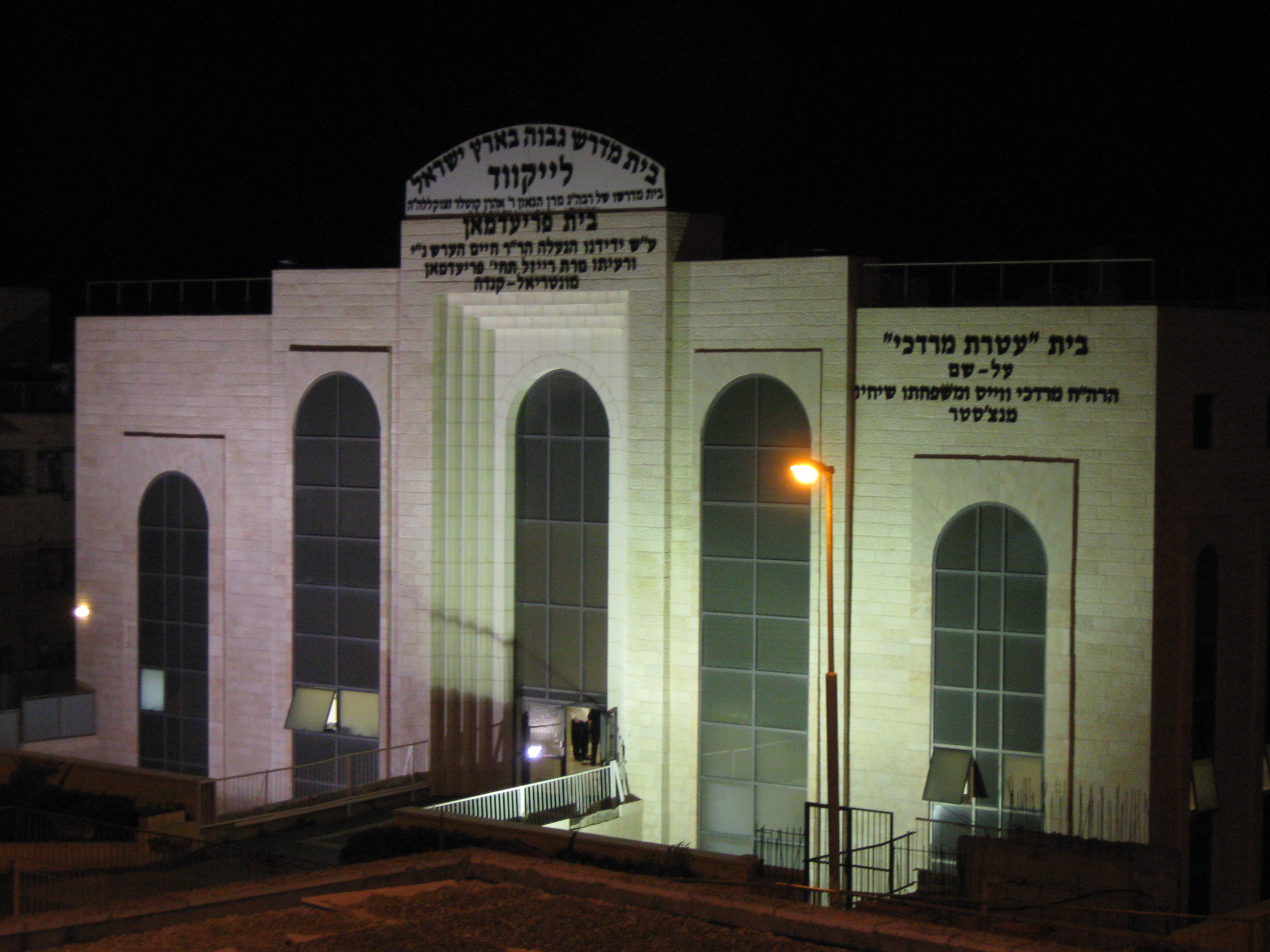
Nighttime facade of Lakewood East.

- Lakewood East, officially Beth Medrash Govoha of America in Eretz Yisroel is located in Ramot.
- Ateret Yerushalayim, An English speaking post-high school Yeshiva.
- Ohr Torah Stone - Jacob Sapirstein Junior High and High School for Boys.
- Yeshiva Ohr HaTzafon, An English speaking post-high school Yeshiva.
- Ahavat Yisrael - Rappaport for boys, a Chardal primary and Jr. High School.
- Noam Ramot (boys and girls), a primary School.

== Parks and nature trails ==
- Ramot Forest is located in Ramot. At the edge of the forest is the Gan Kipod children's park featuring a porcupine-shaped slide.
- Ramot Forest Gazelle Trail, a natural Gazelle habitat is located there as well.
- Ramot has a community swimming pool, called Ramot Community Pool.
- Arazim Valley Park, a section of Jerusalem Metropolitan Park, has an entrance in Ramot.

== Landmarks ==
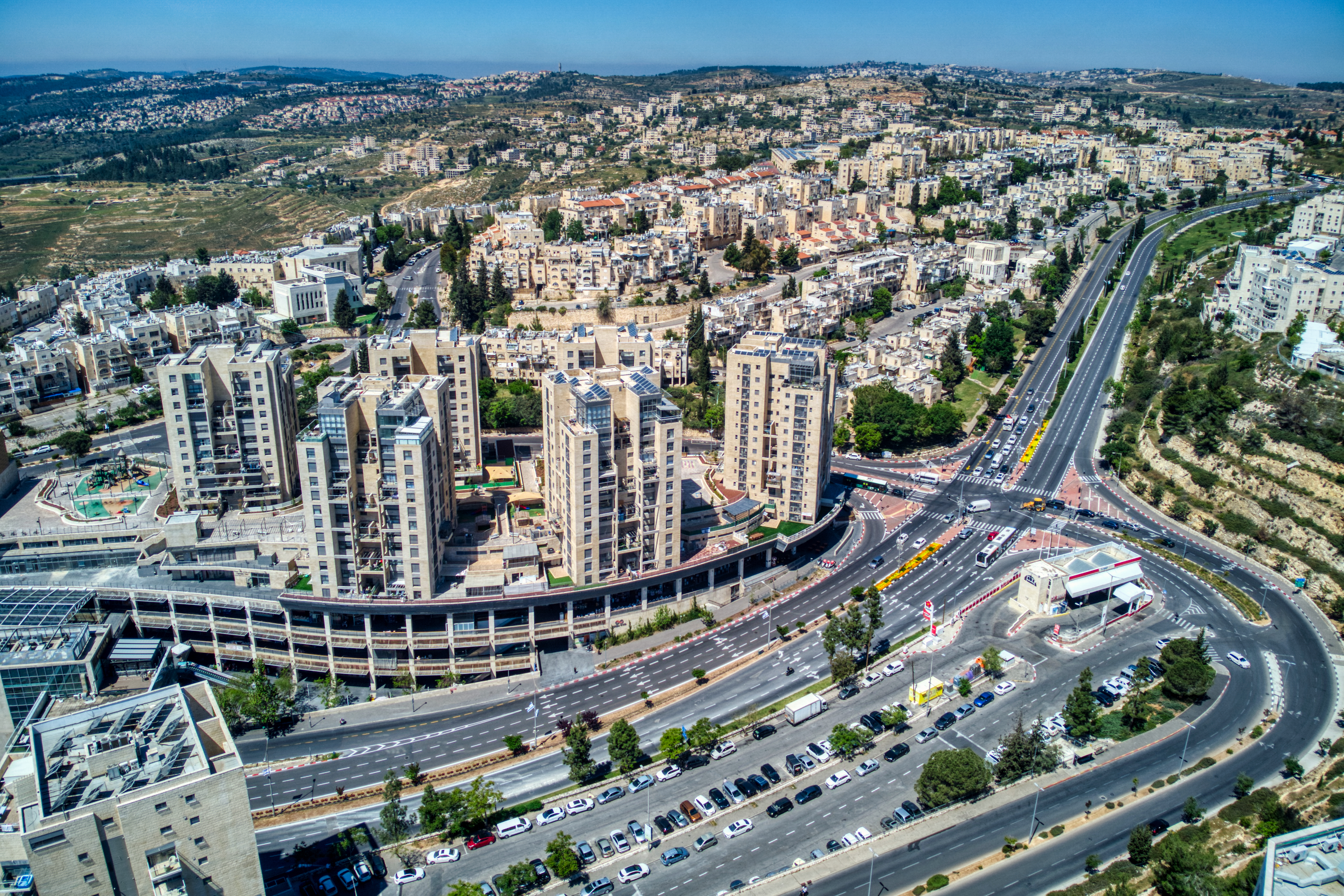
Ramot Mall and Route 436

In November 2009, 30-foot high bronze sculpture depicting a waving American flag turning into a flame was unveiled in Ramot, part of a five-acre memorial plaza for the September 11 terrorist attacks. The sculpture, located in Arazim Valley, was the first memorial outside New York to list the names of the 2,974 people killed in the attack. Part of the gray granite base, taken from the original Twin Towers, was donated by the New York municipality. Israeli sculptor Eliezer Weishoff said the memorial had to be moved 200 yards from the planned site to accommodate gazelle migration pathways. U.S. Ambassador James B. Cunningham and a number of congressmen attended the event.

Ramot Mall, which is Jerusalem's 2nd largest mall, opened in September 2011.

The Palestinian village of Nabi Samwil is located close to Ramot.

== Archaeology ==
=== First Temple period ===
A man walking his dog fell into a pit while running in the Ramot Forest. This led to the discovery of a grape-pressing area from the First Temple period.

=== Second Temple period ===
Khirbet Tililiya is the site of an ancient ruined fortress on a high hill in the center of Ramot Alon. The ruins are dated to the Second Temple period (namely the Hasmonean and Herodian eras).

In May 2005, a salvage excavation conducted in the Ramot neighborhood on behalf of the Israel Antiquities Authority (IAA) found a rock-hewn burial cave surmounted by a massive rectangular building and a columbarium cave. Potsherds dating to the Ottoman period were discovered on the floor of the building. Fragments of jars and cooking pots dating to the Early Roman period were discovered in the columbarium, which is characteristic of the Hellenistic and Early Roman periods.

=== Crusader period ===
There are Crusader-period remains in Ramot 2 and Ramot 6.

== Neighborhoods ==
Ramot has seven neighborhoods; Aleph (A), Bet (B), Gimmel (G), Daled (D), and Vav (V) (also known as Ramot 06) and Ramot Polin.

There is a "County" area of Ramot being built with 294 apartments.

In November 2015 plans for the Ramot Slopes neighborhood was approved. A total of 1,638 housing units will be built, of which 203 will be designated for assisted living, and about 400 of which will be small apartments.
