= Atarot =

Site of destroyed Moshav in Mandatory Palestine

Atarot עטרות
- Moshav
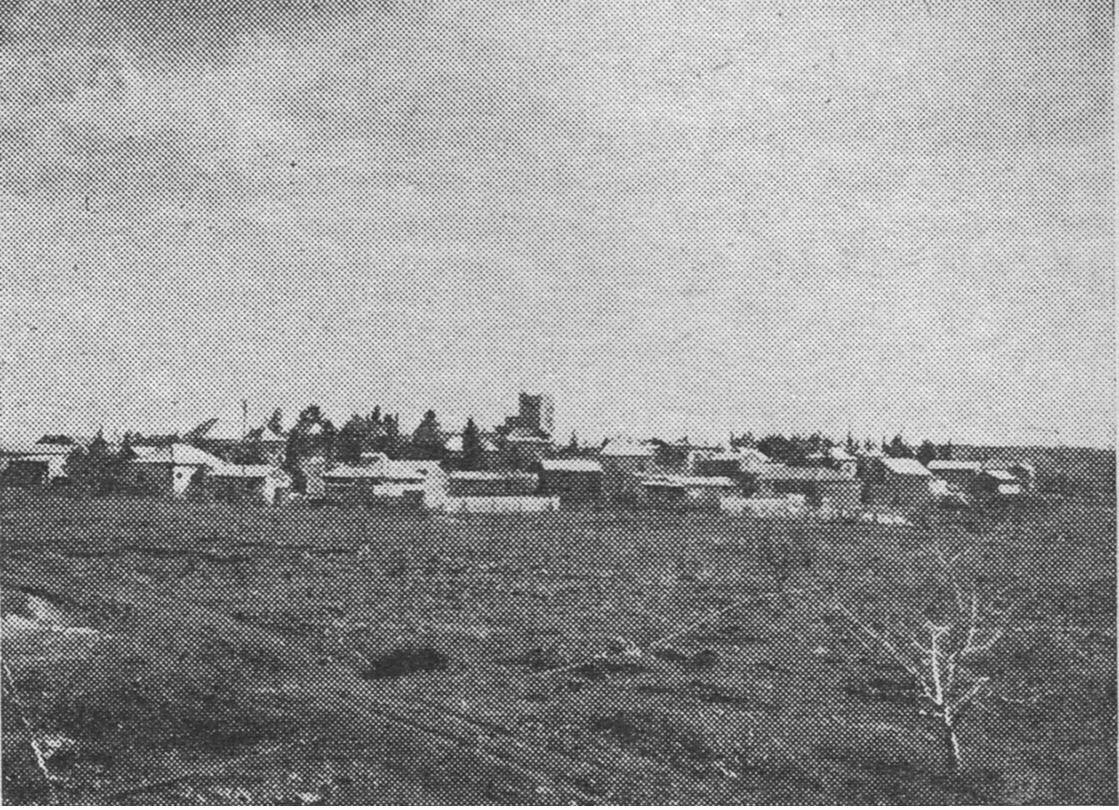
- Atarot, 1944

- Location within Mandatory Palestine
- Coordinates: 31°51′N 35°13′E
- Established: 1914

Atarot (Arabic: عطروت Hebrew: עטרות) was a moshav in Mandatory Palestine, north of Jerusalem along the highway to Ramallah. It was named after the biblical Atarot mentioned in Joshua 16:2, which is believed to have been situated nearby. The moshav was captured and destroyed by the Jordanian Arab Legion during the 1948 Arab-Israeli War. Atarot Airport, closed since the Second Intifada. Today, the area hosts the Atarot Industrial Zone, which is Jerusalem's largest industrial zone.

== History ==
=== Establishment ===
In 1912, the Palestine Land Development Corporation (PLDC) purchased land in the hills north of Jerusalem from the neighbouring Arab village of Qalandia. In 1914 the tract was settled by Zionist youth of the Second Aliyah who prepared the rocky soil for agriculture. Among the settlers was Levi Eshkol, a future Prime Minister of Israel.

After the outbreak of World War I, the project was abandoned until 1922, when a group of workers returned to the area to continue reclamation and planting work. This group leased some of the land to local Arabs and acquired more tracts for settlement. The plan was to ready the land for sale to individuals and groups. When the venture proved unsuccessful, the Jewish National Fund bought 375 dunams of the best land. It was on this land that Atarot was established. The village was named for the biblical town of Ataroth believed to be located nearby.

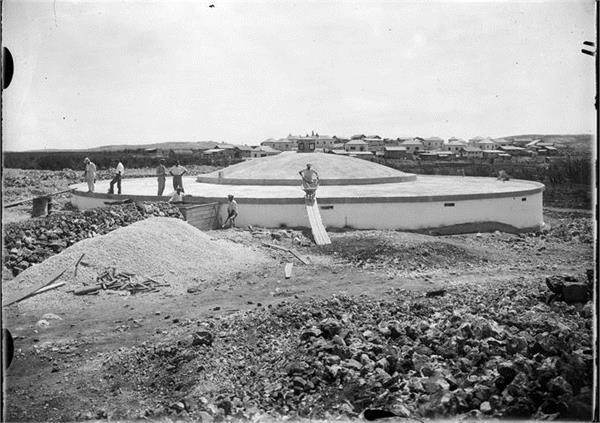
Atarot construction of water tank 1928

In 1925, Atarot was joined by Neve Yaakov, creating a bloc of Jewish settlement in the area. In 1931, the British Mandatory government expropriated 200 of the 375 dunams to construct a small airfield, in the process demolishing homes and uprooting fruit orchards, and harming the village's growth. The PLDC sold more of the land such that the moshav members were left with only 14 dunam per plot, while 30 dunam was considered to be the minimum necessary for sufficient income. Water shortages also plagued the village, as the locally constructed reservoir could not satisfy the needs, and so it was necessary to purchase water from neighbouring Arab villages as well as from the expensive British-built Jerusalem municipal pipes.

Atarot farmers supplied fruit, produce and dairy products to Jerusalem. Some of the moshav's fields were located at a distance, which created a security problem during the 1929 Palestine riots and 1936–1939 Arab revolt in Palestine when its residents were shot at, robbed, and besieged.

According to a census conducted in 1931 by the British Mandate authorities, Atarot had a population of 250 inhabitants, in 59 inhabited houses.

In the 1940s, the village had a population of 150.

=== Depopulation in 1948 War ===
Following the Israeli Declaration of Independence and attack of five Arab armies, the village withstood repeated attacks and acted as a bulwark during the Jordanian Arab Legion's 1948 Siege of Jerusalem. The Haganah command for the Jerusalem area finally decided to evacuate the remaining defenders; they left on 17 May 1948. The Jordanian forces looted and burned the village, turning the land into an extension of Kalandia Airport.

The refugees maintained their desire to remain organised as an agricultural cooperative, and in August of that year they were resettled in the former Templer village of Wilhelma, which they named Bnei Atarot in remembrance of their original home.

Israeli author Esther Streit-Wertzel was commissioned in 2005 by the original families to write a chronicle of the village; she ultimately produced a novel on the topic.

=== 1967 war and aftermath ===
Following the 1967 Six-Day War, the airport and site of the former village were captured by Israel along with the rest of the West Bank. The area was annexed into the expanded Jerusalem Municipality, and an industrial park was developed alongside the airport, renamed for the former village.

==== Second Intifada ====
During the Second Intifada, the park and airport suffered from Palestinian attacks due to their proximity to Ramallah, leading to the closure of the airport.

On February 27, 2000, a young Jewish Israeli businessman, Gadi Rejwan, who owned a factory in Atarot, was shot to death by one of his Arab workers.

== Industrial zone ==
Before the Intifada, the zone housed over 200 companies including Coca-Cola, Mercedes-Benz, Israel Aircraft Industries, and many Arab-owned and joint enterprises. Some 4,000 people were employed prior to 2000, Arabs from Jerusalem and the West Bank comprising about two-thirds.

With the ebbing of violence, the Atarot Industrial Zone saw renewed activity, and several new companies moved in, aided by the new Highway 45's linking the area to the nearby Route 443 expressway to the Tel Aviv metropolitan area and Highway 50 (Begin Boulevard) to central Jerusalem. As of 2003, the area, which has surpassed Har Hotzvim to become the largest industrial zone in Jerusalem, houses 160 factories in a variety of industries. The area is managed by a non profit organisation, which successfully lobbied the Jerusalem Municipality for the right to handle security, previously carried out by private firms.

== Waste transfer station ==
A new waste transfer station in Atarot started receiving waste from Jerusalem in February 2014. According to Israel's Ministry of Environmental Protection, the new waste station will allow the closure of the polluting waste facility located in Abu Dis.

== See also ==
- Yishuv
- Economy of Israel
