= A55 =

A55 may refer to:

== Roads ==
- A55 highway (Australia), a road connecting St George, Queensland and Lithgow, New South Wales
- A55 motorway (Canada), a road in Québec connecting Stanstead and Shawinigan
- A55 motorway (France), a road connecting Marseille and Martigues
- A55 road (Great Britain), a road connecting Chester and Holyhead
- Autostrada A55 (Italy), a bypass around Turin
- A55 road (Northern Ireland), a road around Belfast

== Electronics ==
- A-series light bulb of diameter 55 mm
- A model of a Fusion Controller Hub (FCH), a chipset used for AMD microprocessors
- Samsung Galaxy A55 5G, a mobile phone
- Sony Alpha 55, a DSLT camera
- Siemens A55, a mobile phone
- ARM Cortex-A55, a processor microarchitecture

== Other ==
- Old Indian Defense, Encyclopaedia of Chess Openings code
- Austin Cambridge A55, a British car
- GER Class A55, a British steam locomotive
- A bypass or substitute for the word ass

== See also ==
- List of highways numbered 55
