= List of highways numbered 55A =

The following highways are numbered 55A:

== United States ==
- County Road 55A (Dixie County, Florida)
  - County Road 55A (Gilchrist County, Florida)
  - County Road 55A (Levy County, Florida)
- Missouri Route 55A (former)
- Nebraska Spur 55A
- New York State Route 55A
