= List of modern names for biblical place names =

While a number of biblical place names like Jerusalem, Athens, Damascus, Alexandria, Babylon and Rome have been used for centuries, some have changed over the years. Many place names in the Land of Israel, Holy Land and Palestine are Arabised forms of ancient Hebrew and Canaanite place-names used during biblical times or later Aramaic or Greek formations. Most of these names have been handed down for thousands of years though their meaning was understood by only a few.

== Hebrew Bible or Old Testament ==
Biblical name	Original Hebrew	Mentioned in	Present name	Province or Region	Country Name
Abel-Beth-Maachah	אָבֵל בֵּית-מַעֲכָה	1 Kings 15:20	Tell Abel-beth-maachah (Tell Abil el-Qameḥ)	Northern District	Israel
Abel-Shittim (Shittim/Ha-Shittim)	אָבֵל הַשִּׁטִּים	Numbers 33:49, 25:1; Joshua 2:1, 3:1; Micah 6:5	Tall el-Hammam	Amman Governorate	Jordan
Ai	הָעַי	Joshua 7:2	Khirbet Haiy; or Deir Dibwan (Et-Tell)	Ramallah and al-Bireh Governorate	Palestine
Almon	עַלְמוֹן	Joshua 21:18	Khirbet Almit	Jerusalem Governorate	Palestine
Anathoth	עֲנָתוֹת	Joshua 21:13-18; Jeremiah 1:1, 29:27, 32:7-9; 1 Chronicles 6:54-60	'Anata	Jerusalem Governorate	Palestine
Ashtaroth (Ashteroth-Karnaim) (Note: Ashtaroth and Karnaim were two different cities that later combined to form Ashteroth-Karnaim.)	עשתרות	Genesis 14:5; Deuteronomy 1:4; Joshua 9:10, 12:4, 13:12, 31	Tell Ashtara	Daraa Governorate	Syria
Ataroth	עֲטָר֤וֹת	Numbers 32:3, 32:34	Khirbat Ataruz	Madaba Governorate	Jordan
Azekah	עֲזֵקָה	Joshua 10:10-11; 1 Samuel 17; Jeremiah 34:6-7	Tel Azeka (Tell Zakariya)	Jerusalem District	Israel
Azmaveth	עַזְמָוֶת	Ezra 2:24; Nehemiah 7:28; Nehemiah 12:29	Hizma	Jerusalem Governorate	Palestine
Assyria	בָּבֶל	Jeremiah 50:1–46	Borsippa; others say Hillah	Babil Governorate	Iraq
Bahurim	בַּחֻרִים	2 Samuel 3:16	Abu Dis	Jerusalem Governorate	Palestine
Beth-Anath	בֵית-עֲנָת	Joshua 19:38; Judges 1:33	Bi'ina	Northern District	Israel
Beth-Arbel	בֵּית אַרְבֵאל	Hosea 10:14	Irbid	Irbid Governorate	Jordan
Bethel	בֵּית-אֵל	Genesis 28:19; 1 Kings 12:29	Beitin and Beth El	Ramallah and al-Bireh Governorate	Palestine
Beth-Jeshimoth	בֵּית הַיְשִׁמוֹת	Numbers 33:49; Joshua 12:3, 13:20; Ezekiel 25:9	Sweimeh	Balqa Governorate	Jordan
Beth-Tappuah	בֵית-תַּפּוּחַ	Joshua 15:53	Taffuh	Hebron Governorate	Palestine
Beth-Shemesh	בֵּית שֶׁמֶשׁ	Joshua 15:10, 21:16; 1 Samuel 6:12-21	Beit Shemesh	Jerusalem District	Israel
Bozrah	בָּצְרָה	Amos 1:12	Bouseira	Tafilah Governorate	Jordan
Chephirah	הַכְּפִירָה	Joshua 9:17, 18:26; Ezra 2:25; Nehemiah 7:29	Khirbet el-Kafira	Jerusalem Governorate	Palestine
Chesalon	כְּסָלוֹן	Joshua 15:10	Ksalon	Jerusalem District	Israel
Chesulloth (Chisloth-Tabor)	כִּסְלוֹת תָּבוֹר	Joshua 19:18	Iksal	Northern District	Israel
Chezib (Achzib)	כְזִיב	Genesis 38:5; Joshua 15:44	Khirbet esh Sheikh Ghazy	Jerusalem District	Israel
Chittim	כַּתַּים	Numbers 24:24	Cyprus	N/A	Cyprus
Cuthah	כּוּתָה	2 Kings 17:24	Tell Ibrahim	Babil Governorate	Iraq
Dan (Leshem/Laish/Laishah)	לַיִשׁ/דָּן	Joshua 19:47; Judges 18:29; Isaiah 10:30	Tel Dan	Northern District	Israel
Dedan	דְּדָן	Ezekiel 38:13	Al-'Ula	Al Madinah Region	Saudi Arabia
Debir (Kiriath-Sepher/Kiriath-Sannah)	דְּבִיר	Judges 1:11; Joshua 15:49	Khirbet Rabud (mainstream opinion); Tell Beit Mirsim	Hebron Governorate	Palestine
Dothan	דֹתָן	Genesis 37:17; 2 Kings 6:13	Tel Dothan (Tel al-Hafireh)	Jenin Governorate	Palestine
Ecbatana	אַחְמְתָא	Ezra 6:2	Hamadan	Hamadan Province	Iran
Edrei	אֶדְרֶעִי	Numbers 21:33; Deuteronomy 3:1	Daraa	Daraa Governorate	Syria
Eglon	עֶגְלוֹן	Joshua 10:3-5; 10:44-46; 15:20-39	Tel 'Eton	Southern District	Israel
Ekron	עֶקְרֽוֹן	Joshua 15:45; Judges 1:18; 1 Samuel 5:10	Tel Miqne	Jerusalem District	Israel
Elim	אֵילִם	Exodus 16:1	Wadi Gharandel	South Sinai Governorate	Egypt
En-Gannim	עֵין גַּנִּים	Joshua 19:21	Jenin	Jenin Governorate	Palestine
Erech	אֶרֶךְ	Genesis 10:10	Uruk	Al Muthanna Governorate	Iraq
Eshtemoa	אֶשְׁתְּמֹעַ	Joshua 21:14	as-Samu	Hebron Governorate	Palestine
Etam	עֵיטָם	2 Chronicles 11:6	Solomon's Pools	Bethlehem Governorate	Palestine
Gath	גַּת	Joshua 13:3	Tell es-Safi (mainstream opinion); Ramla	Central District	Israel
Gath-Hepher	גִּתָּה חֵפֶר	Joshua 19:13; 2 Kings 14:25	Gob'batha of Sepphoris	Northern District	Israel
Geba	גֶּבַע	Joshua 18:24-28, 21:17; 1 Samuel 13:3; 1 Kings 15:22; 2 Kings 23:8; Isaiah 10:29; Nehemiah 11:31; 2	Jaba'	Jerusalem Governorate	Palestine
Gederah	גְּדֵרָה	Joshua 15:36	al-Judeira	Jerusalem Governorate	Palestine
Gerar	גְּרָר	Genesis 10:19	Haluza	Southern District	Israel
Gezer	גֶּזֶר	Joshua 10:33; 1 Kings 9:15-16	Tel Gezer	Central District	Israel
Gibbethon	גִּבְּתוֹן	Joshua 19:44; 1 Kings 15:27; 16:15-17	Tel Malot	Central District	Israel
Gibeah of Benjamin	גִּבְעָה	Joshua 18:28	Tell el-Ful	Jerusalem District	Israel
Gibeon	גִּבְעוֹן	Joshua 10:12	Al-Jib	Jerusalem Governorate	Palestine
Giloh	גִּלֹה	Joshua 15:51	Beit Jala and Giloh	Bethlehem Governorate	Palestine
Gittaim	גִּתָּיִם	2 Samuel 4:3; Nehemiah 11:33	Khirbet el-Burj	Jerusalem Governorate	Palestine
Gozan	גּוֹזָן	1 Chronicles 5:26	Tell Halaf	Al Hasakah Governorate	Syria
Hali	חֲלִ֖י	Joshua 19:25	Adi	Northern District	Israel
Hachilah	גִבְעַ֣ת הַחֲכִילָ֗ה	1 Samuel 23:19, 26:1	Dhahret el-Kolah	Hebron Governorate	Palestine
Harosheth Haggoyim	חֲרֹשֶׁת הַגּוֹיִם	Judges 4:13	El Ahwat (?)	Haifa District	Israel
Hamath	חֲמָת	2 Samuel 8:9	Hama	Hama Governorate	Syria
Hammath	חַמַּת	Joshua 19:35	Tiberias	Northern District	Israel
Hapharaim	חֲפָרַיִם	Joshua 19:19	eṭ Ṭaiyibeh	Northern District	Israel
Hazezon-Tamar (Engedi)	חַצְצוֹן תָּמָר	Genesis 14:7	Ein Gedi	Southern District	Israel
Hazor	חָצוֹר	Nehemiah 11:33	Khirbet Hazzur	Jerusalem Governorate	Palestine
Hebron (Kiriath-Arba)	חֶבְרוֹן	Genesis 13:18; 23:2; Numbers 13:22; Joshua 11:21, 21:10-13; 2 Samuel 2:1-3, 15:10	Tell Rumeida	Hebron Governorate	Palestine
Hukkok	חוּקֹק	Joshua 19:34	Yaquq	Northern District	Israel
Ibleam	יִבְלְעָם	Joshua 17:11	Khirbet Yebla	Northern District	Israel
Ijon	עִיּוֹן	1 Kings 15:20; 2 Kings 15:29; 2 Chronicles 17:4	Tell ed-Dibbin	Nabatieh Governorate	Lebanon
Jabesh-Gilead	יָבֵשׁ גִּלְעָד	Judges 21:8-15; 1 Samuel 11, 31:8-13	Tell el-Maqlub, Tell Abu el-Kharaz	Irbid Governorate	Jordan
Joppa	יָפוֹ	Joshua 19:46; Jonah 1:3; 2 Chronicles 2:15	Jaffa	Tel Aviv District	Israel
Jarmuth	יַרְמוּת	Joshua 10:3–5	Tel Jarmuth	Jerusalem District	Israel
Jezreel	יִזְרְעֶאל	1 Kings 18:45	Zir'in and Jezreel	Northern District	Israel
Jiron	יִרְאוֹן	Joshua 19:38	Yaroun	Nabatieh Governorate	Lebanon
Jogbehah	יָגְבְּהָה	Numbers 32:35; Judges 8:11	Al-Jubeiha	Amman Governorate	Jordan
Jokneam	יָקְנְעָם	Joshua 19:11; 21:34	Tel Yokneam, northern part of Yokneam Illit	Northern District	Israel
Juttah	יוּטָּה	Joshua 15:55; 21:16	Yatta	Hebron Governorate	Palestine
Kadesh (Note: There are two places called Kadesh in the Bible, this is the one in the wilderness of Paran.)	קָדֵשׁ	Numbers 20:1	Petra	Ma'an Governorate	Jordan
Kadesh-Barnea (Note: There are two places called Kadesh in the Bible, this is the one in the wilderness of Zin.)	קָדֵשׁ בַּרְנֵעַ	Deuteronomy 1:2	Tell el-Qudeirat	Sinai Peninsula	Egypt
Kedesh	קֶדֶשׁ נַפְתָּלִי	Judges 4:6	Kedesh	Northern District	Israel
Kir-Hareseth	קִיר-מוֹאָב	Isaiah 15:1; 16:11	Al Karak	Karak Governorate	Jordan
Kiriath-Jearim	קִרְיַת יְעָרִים	Joshua 9:17	Abu Ghosh	Jerusalem District	Israel
Kitron	קִטְרוֹן	Judges 1:30	Sepphoris	Northern District	Israel
Lachish	לָכִישׁ	Joshua 12:11; 2 Kings 14:19; Josiah 36:2; Jeremiah 44:7	Tell Lachish (ed-Duweir) just north of moshav Lachish	Southern District	Israel
Lebonah	לְבוֹנָה	Judges 21:19	Al-Lubban ash-Sharqiya	Nablus Governorate	Palestine
Mahanaim	מַּחֲנַיִם	Genesis 32:2; Joshua 13:26-30, 21:38; 2 Samuel 2:8, 18:2	Tulul edh-Dhahab el-Gharbi	Jerash Governorate	Jordan
Mareshah	מָרֵשָׁה	Joshua 15:44; 2 Chronicles 11:8	Tel Maresha	Southern District	Israel
Medeba	מֵידְבָא	Numbers 21:30; Joshua 13:9	Madaba	Madaba Governorate	Jordan
Megiddo	מְגִדּוֹ	Joshua 17:11; 1 Chronicles 7:29	Tel Megiddo just north of kibbutz Megiddo	Northern District	Israel
Memphis	נֹף	Isaiah 19:13	Memphis	Giza Governorate	Egypt
Michmash	מִכְמָשׂ	1 Samuel 13:11-23, 14:5; Isaiah 10:28; Nehemiah 7:31, 11:31; Ezra 2:26-27;	Mukhmas	Jerusalem Governorate	Palestine
Mozah	מוֹצָה	Joshua 18:26	Motza	Jerusalem District	Israel
Nephtoah	נֶפְתּוֹחַ	Joshua 15:9	Lifta	Jerusalem District	Israel
Netophah	נְטֹפָה	Ezra 2:22	Umm Tuba	East Jerusalem	
On	אֹן	Genesis 46:20	Ayn Shams	Cairo Governorate	Egypt
Ono	אוֹנוֹ	1 Chronicles 8:12	Or Yehuda	Central District	Israel
Ophrah	עָפְרָה	Joshua 18:23	Taybeh	Ramallah and al-Bireh Governorate	Palestine
Penuel	פְּנוּאֵל	Genesis 32:22-32; 1 Kings 12:25	Tulul edh-Dhahab esh-Sharqi, Tall al-Hamma East	Jerash Governorate	Jordan
Pi-Beseth	פִי-בֶסֶת	Ezekiel 30:17	Tell Basta	Al Sharqia Governorate	Egypt
Pirathon	פִּרְעָתוֹן	Judges 12:15	Fara'ata	Qalqilya Governorate	Palestine
Rabbah	רַבָּה	Joshua 15:60	Rebbo (Note: Tentatively identified by Conder & Kitchener with the biblical city of Rabba (Josh. 15:60) because of their phonetic similarity, and which site is located in the territory given by lot to the tribe of Judah. Still, it is only a conjecture, without any valid oral tradition to substantiate the claim, or otherwise refute the claim. Others have speculated that the Rabbah of Joshua 15:60 may be the town known as Rbt, an unidentified town believed to have been near the biblical Gezer and mentioned in Thutmosis III’s list of Canaanite cities (no. 105), and what is also thought to be mentioned in a cuneiform letter found at Taanach. According to two el-Amarna letters (289, 290) sent by the king of Jerusalem to the pharaoh, Milkilu, the king of Gezer, together with Shuwardata captured Rubutu with the aid of mercenaries. The problem with this identification, however, is that no one has yet found a city near Gezer by the name of Rbt or Rubutu, and even if they had, Gezer - and by way of extension, Rabbah - would not be in the territorial domain of the tribe of Judah, but rather in what belonged to Ephraim (cf. Josh. 21:20–21). It was, therefore, imperative to look for the Rabbah in the tribal inheritance of Judah.)	Jerusalem District	Israel
Rabbah of the Ammonites	רַבַּת בְּנֵי-עַמּוֹן	Deuteronomy 3:11; 2 Samuel 11:1, 12:26, 17:27; Amos 1:14	Amman	Amman Governorate	Jordan
Ramah (Note: There are multiple places called Ramah in the Bible, this is the one in the territory of the tribe of Asher.)	רָמָה	Joshua 19:29	Rameh	Northern District	Israel
Ramah (Note: There are multiple places called Ramah in the Bible, this is the one in the territory of the tribe of Benjamin.)	רָמָה	Joshua 18:24-25; Judges 19:13; 1 Samuel 22:6; 1 Kings 15:17; Jeremiah 40:1; Ezra 2:26	Er-Ram, Nabi Samwil	Jerusalem Governorate	Palestine
Rakkath	רַקַּת	Joshua 19:35	Tiberias	Northern District	Israel
Rehob	רְחֹב	Joshua 21:31	Tel Rehov	Northern District	Israel
Sarid	שָׂרִיד	Joshua 19:10	Tell Shadud just east of kibbutz Sarid	Northern District	Israel
Seba	סְבָא	Psalm 72:10	Meroë	River Nile Governorate	Sudan
Shaaraim	שַׁעֲרַ֔יִם	Joshua 15:36; 1 Samuel 17:52; 1 Chronicles 4:31	Khirbet Qeiyafa	Jerusalem District	Israel
Shalishah (Baal-Shalishah)	בַּעַל שָׁלִשָׁה	1 Samuel 9:4; 2 Kings 4:42	Kh. Sirisia	Salfit Governorate	Palestine
Sheba	שְׁבָא	1 Kings 10:1	Ma'rib	Ma'rib Governorate	Yemen
Shechem	שְׁכֶם	Genesis 12:6	Tell Balata at Nablus and Shechem	Nablus Governorate	Palestine
Shiloah	שִּׁלֹחַ	Isaiah 8:6	Silwan		Disputed
Shiloh	שִׁילֹה, שִׁילוֹ	Joshua 18:1; Judges 21:19	Khirbet Seilun/Tel Shiloh	Ramallah and al-Bireh Governorate	Palestine
Shomron (Samaria)	שֹׁמְרוֹן	1 Kings 16:24	Sebastia	Nablus Governorate	Palestine
Shunem	שׁוּנֵם	2 Kings 4:8; Joshua 19:18	Sulam	Northern District	Israel
Sin	סִין	Ezekiel 30:15	Tell el Farama	North Sinai Governorate	Egypt
Socoh	שׂוֹכֹה	Joshua 15:35	Tell Socho (Kh. Shuweika)	Jerusalem District	Israel
Succoth	סֻכּוֹת	Joshua 13:27; Genesis 33:17	Deir Alla	Balqa Governorate	Jordan
Susa	שׁוּשַׁן	Nehemiah 1:1	Shush	Khūzestān Province	Iran
Syene	סְוֵנֵה	Ezekiel 29:10, 30:6	Aswan	Aswan Governorate	Egypt
Taanath Shiloh	תַּאֲנַת שִׁלֹה	Joshua 16:6–7	Khirbet Tana el-Foqa or Khirbet Tana et-Tahta	Nablus Governorate	Palestine
Tadmor	תַּדְמֹר	2 Chronicles 8:4	Palmyra	Homs Governorate	Syria
Tahpanhes	תַחְפַּנְחֵס	Jeremiah 44:1	Tell Defenneh	Dakahlia Governorate	Egypt
Teqoa	תְּקוֹעַ	2 Samuel 14:2, 2 Samuel 23:26, Amos 1:1, Nehemiah 3:5, 1 Chronicles 11:28, 2 Chronicles 11:5	Tell Tekoa/Kh. el-Tuqu'	Bethlehem Governorate	Palestine
Thebes	נֹּא אָמוֹן הֲמוֹן נֹא	Nahum 3:8	Luxor	Luxor Governorate	Egypt
Timnah	תִּמְנָה	Judges 14:1	Tell Butashi or Khirbet Tibneh	Jerusalem District	Israel
Timnath-Sarah (Timnath-Heres)	תִמְנַת-חֶרֶס	Joshua 19:50 Joshua 19:20; Judges 2:9	Khirbet Tibnah, others say Kifl Haris	Ramallah and al-Bireh Governorate	Palestine
Tirzah	תִרְצָה	Song of Songs 6:4; Joshua 12:24	Tell el-Far'ah (North) Talluza	Nablus Governorate	Palestine
Ur (Ur of the Chaldees)	אוּר כַּשְׂדִּים	Genesis 11:31; Nehemiah 9:7	Tell el Muqayyar	Dhi Qar Governorate	Iraq
Zaphon	צָפוֹן	Joshua 13:27	Amathus		Jordan
Zarephath	צָרְפַתָה	1 Kings 17:9; Obadiah 20	Sarafand	Southern Governorate	Lebanon
Zephathah	צְפַתָה	2 Chronicles 14:10	Zayta	Southern District	Israel
Ziddim	מִבְצָר-הַצִּדִּים	Joshua 19:35	Hittin	Northern District	Israel
Zoan	צֹעַן	Numbers 13:22	Tanis	Al Sharqia Governorate	Egypt
Zorah	צָרְעָה	Joshua 15:33	Sar'a	Jerusalem District	Israel
Ziph	זִיף	Joshua 15:55; 1 Samuel 23:19; 2 Chronicles 11:8	Zif	Hebron Governorate	Palestine

== New Testament ==
Biblical name	Mentioned in	Present name	Province/Region	Country Name
Adramyttium	Acts 27:2	Burhaniye	Balıkesir Province	Turkey
Antioch	Acts 11:26	Antakya	Hatay Province	Turkey
Antipatris	Acts 23:31	Rosh HaAyin	Central District	Israel
Assos	Acts 20:13	Behramkale	Çanakkale Province	Turkey
Attalia	Acts 14:25	Antalya	Antalya Province	Turkey
Berea	Acts 17:10–13	Veria	Imathia	Greece
Caesarea	Acts 23:23	Caesarea	Haifa District	Israel
Cauda (Clauda)	Acts 27:16	Gavdos	Chania	Greece
Cenchreae	Romans 16:1	Kechries	Korinthía	Greece
Corinth	Acts 18:1	Corinth	Peloponnese	Greece
Cyrene	Acts 13:1	Shahhat	Jabal al Akhdar	Libya
Gerasa	Mark 5:1, Luke 8:26	Kursi	Northern District	Israel
Iconium	Acts 14:1	Konya	Konya Province	Turkey
Laodicea	Revelation 3:14	Eskihisar	Denizli Province	Turkey
Lydda	Acts 9:32	Lod	Central District	Israel
Lystra	Acts 14:8	Klistra	Konya Province	Turkey
Mitylene	Acts 20:14	Mytilene	Lesbos	Greece
Myra	Acts 27:5	Demre	Antalya Province	Turkey
Neapolis	Acts 16:11	Kavala	Eastern Macedonia and Thrace	Greece
Nicopolis	Titus 3:12	Preveza	Epirus	Greece
Pergamum	Revelation 2:12	Bergama	İzmir Province	Turkey
Philadelphia	Revelation 3:7	Alaşehir	Manisa Province	Turkey
Philippi	Acts 16:12, Philippians	Filippoi	Eastern Macedonia and Thrace	Greece
Ptolemais	Acts 21:7	Acre	Northern District	Israel
Puteoli	Acts 28:13	Pozzuoli	Campania	Italy
Rhegium	Acts 28:13	Reggio Calabria	Calabria	Italy
Sardis	Revelation 3:1	Sartmustafa	Manisa Province	Turkey
Smyrna	Revelation 2:8	İzmir	İzmir Province	Turkey
Thessalonica	I & II Thessalonians	Thessaloniki	Central Macedonia	Greece
Thyatira	Revelation 2:18	Akhisar	Manisa Province	Turkey

== See also ==
- Place names of Palestine
- List of minor biblical places
- List of biblical names
- List of cities of the ancient Near East
- List of Hebrew place names
- List of nations mentioned in the Bible
- Cities in the Book of Joshua
