= Ring Settlements =

Ring settlements may refer to:

- Ring settlements around a major city
  - Ring Neighborhoods, Jerusalem
  - Smolensk Ring
