= List of nations mentioned in the Bible =

This is a list of nations mentioned in the Bible.

== A ==
- Ammon
- Amorites
- Arabia
- Aram
- Armenia (in the King James Version), or the "Land of Ararat" (in other translations)
- Province of Asia (now Turkey and Greece)
- Assyria
- Avim

== B ==
- Babylon (Iraq)
- Bashan
- Bulgaria

== C ==
- Canaan
- Kingdom of Cappadocia
- Corinthia
- Crete
- Cyprus

== D ==
- Dalmatia (Croatia)

== E ==
- Edom
- Egypt
- Ethiopia

== G ==
- Gaul (modern France). Only found within the deuterocanonical First Book of Maccabees which is found in the Catholic and Eastern Orthodox bibles.
- Girgashites
- Gog (various times, mainly in the Prophets)
- Greece

== H ==
- Hittites
- Hivites

== I ==
- Iberia (modern Spain and Portugal)
- Illyricum (territories near the Adriatic from modern day Slovenia to Albania)
- India
- Israel
- Italy (Italy generally and the cities of Syracuse and Rome specifically)

== J ==
- Jebusites
- Kingdom of Judah
- Province of Judah

== K ==
- Kingdom of Kush (modern day Ethiopia, Sudan, South Sudan, and Eritrea)
- Kub/Chub (unknown location, possibly Libya)

== L ==
- Lebanon
- Libya
- Lydia

== M ==
- Macedonia
- Malta
- Mesopotamia
- Moab (Jordan)

== P ==
- Perizzites
- Persia (Iran)
- Kingdom of Pontus
- Philistia

== S ==
- Samaria
- Arabia (Saudi Arabia)
- Sheba
- Sinim (Possibly modern China)
- Spain
- Syria (Also referred to as Aram)

== See also ==
- List of biblical names
- List of Hebrew place names
- List of modern names for biblical place names
