= Oyun Musa =

Springs in the south Sinai Peninsula

Coordinates: 29°52′37″N 32°39′30″E

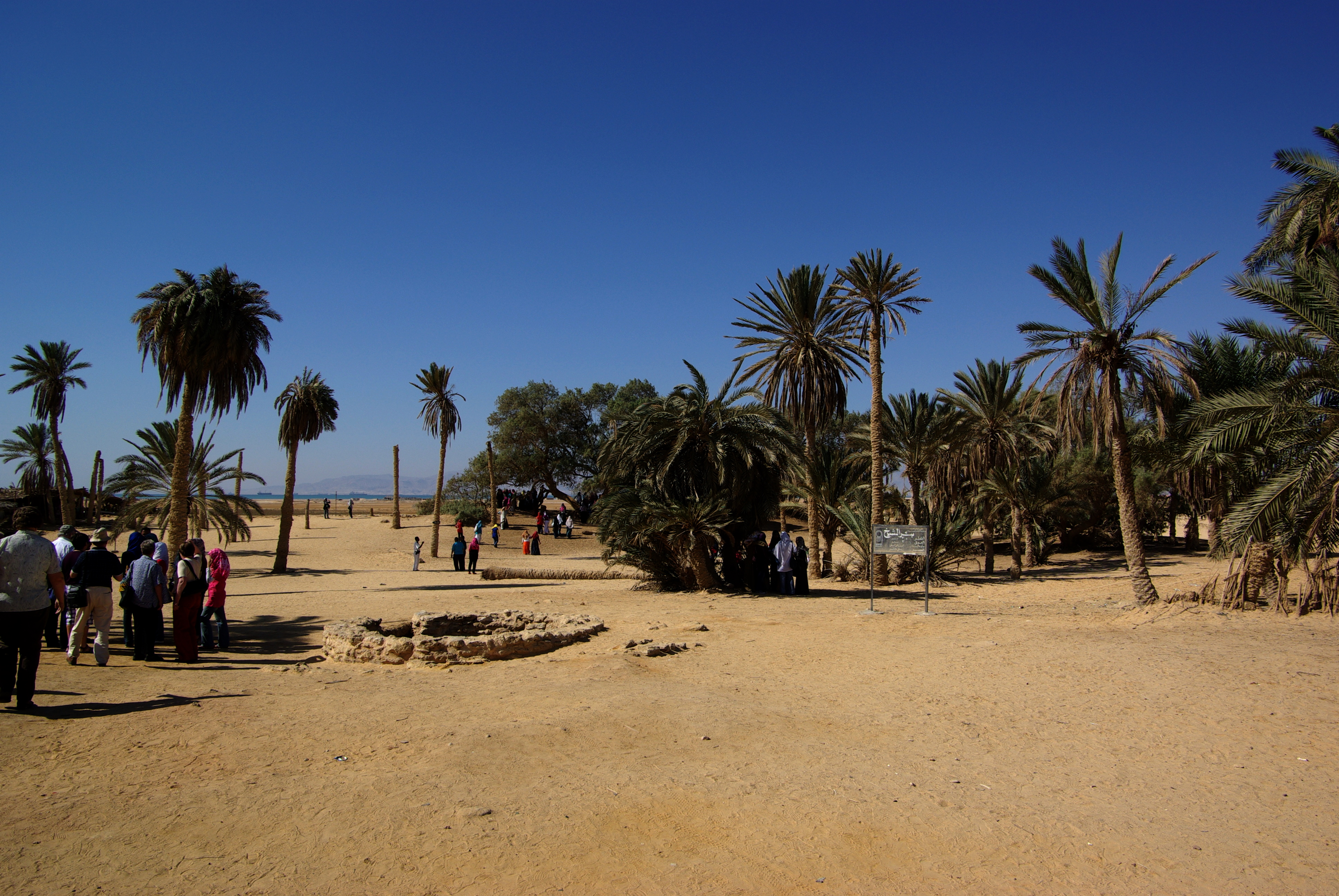
Oyun Musa

Oyun Musa ("Moses Springs", عيون موسى), found 20 km south of the Ahmed Hamdi Tunnel in South Sinai, are a collection of fresh water springs, said to be where Moses first went with the Israelites during the Israelite Exodus.

These are in the area referred to as Elim in Exodus 15:27. This would be where Moses went with the Israelites during the Israelite Exodus after he was directed by Yahweh to throw a tree branch into the bitter springs of Marah, making them sweet enough to drink (Exodus 15:25).

The springs are located on the main Suez to Sharm el Sheikh road behind a Bedouin village settlement of the same name.

== See also ==
- Elim (Bible)
- Well of Moses
