= Ring Settlements, East Jerusalem =

Israeli settlements in East Jerusalem

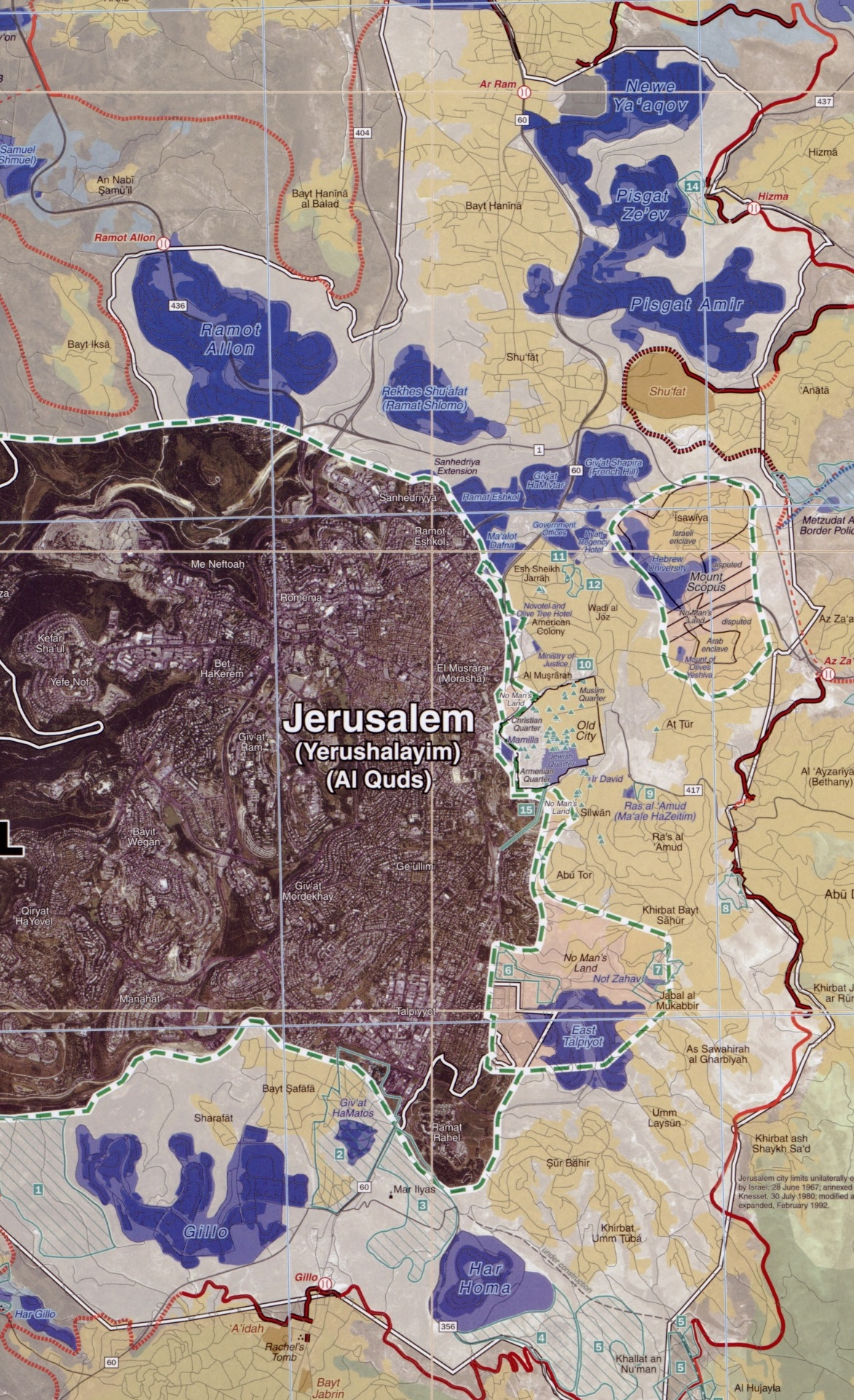
The "Ring Neighborhoods" Israeli settlements in East Jerusalem

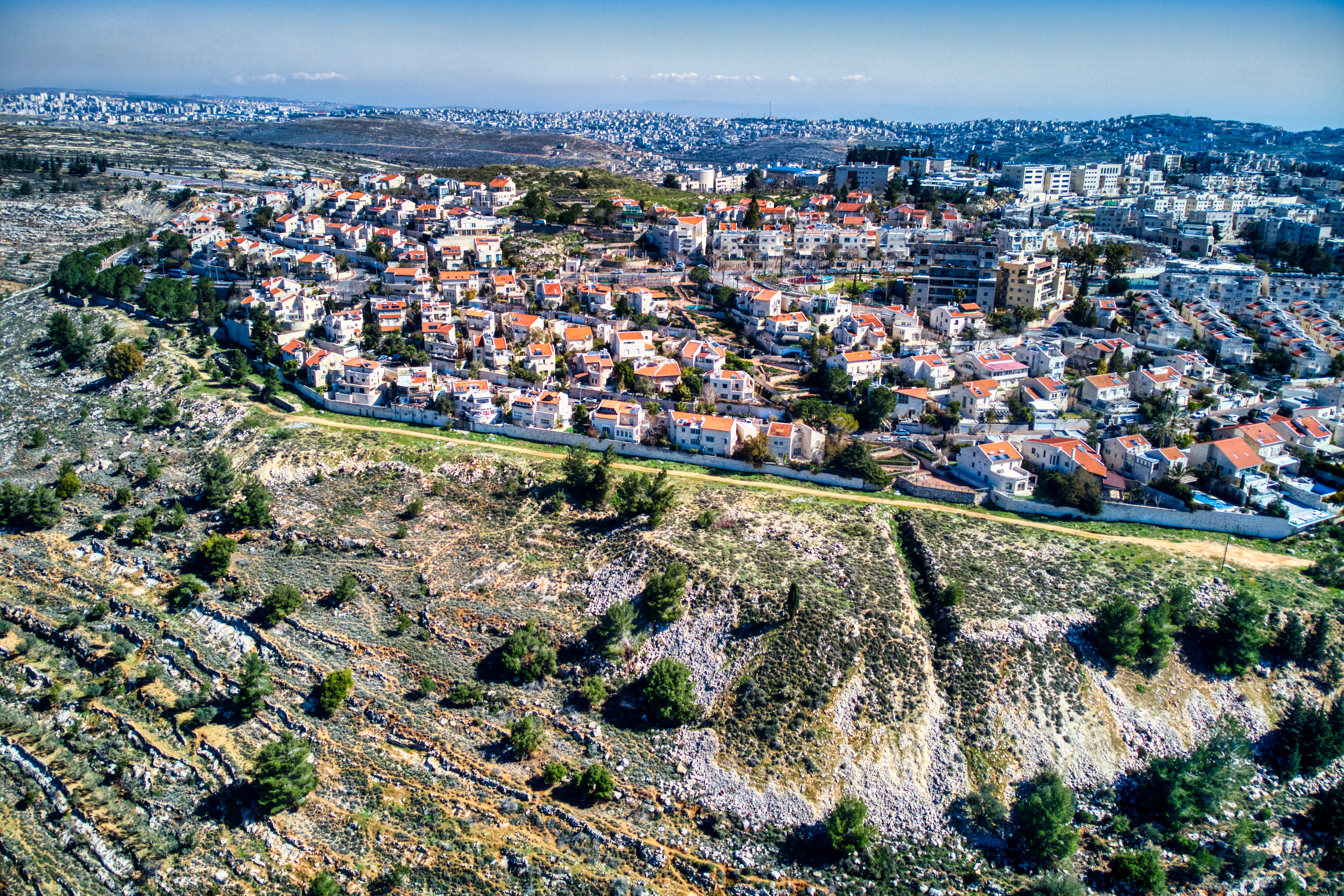
Ramot

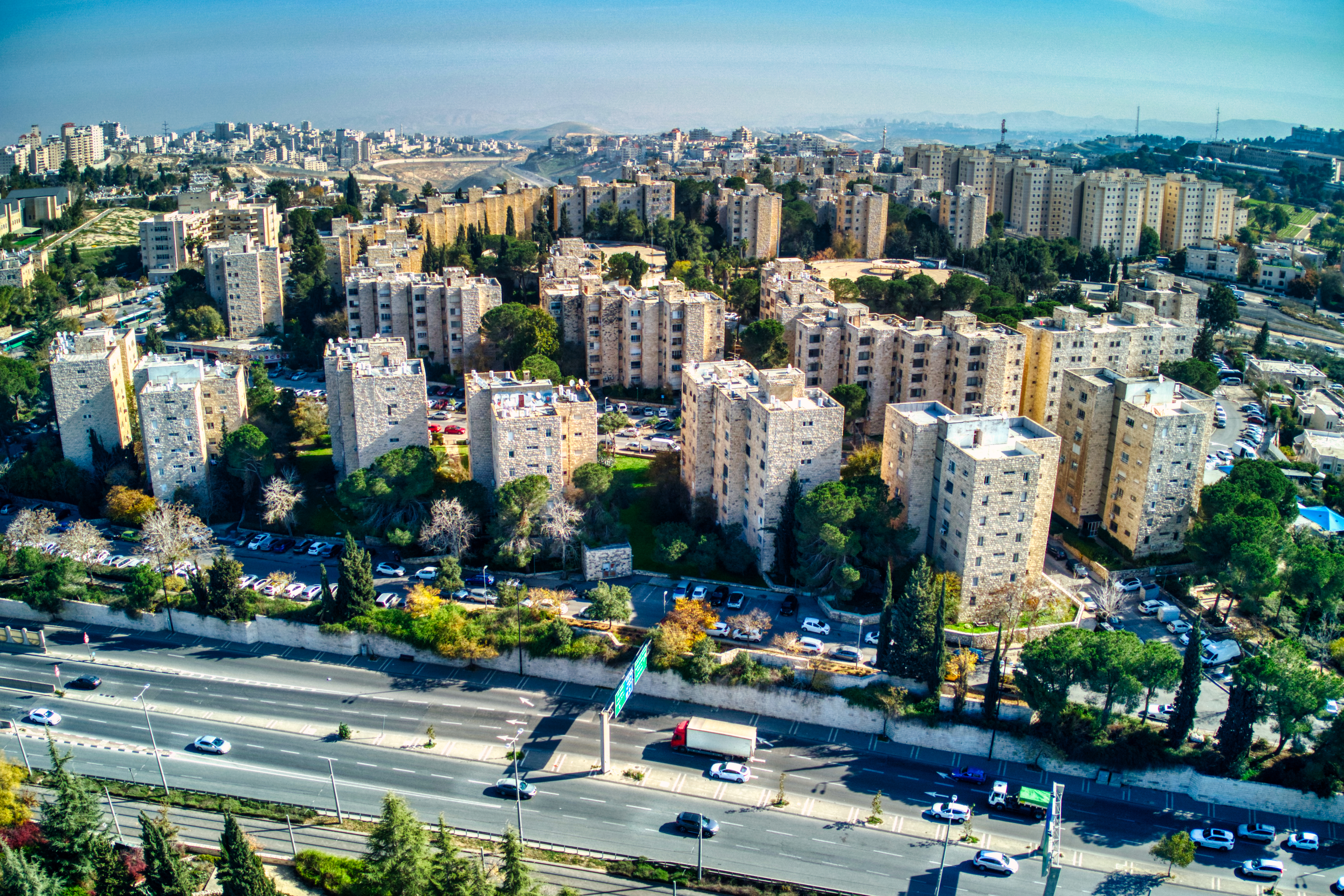
French Hill

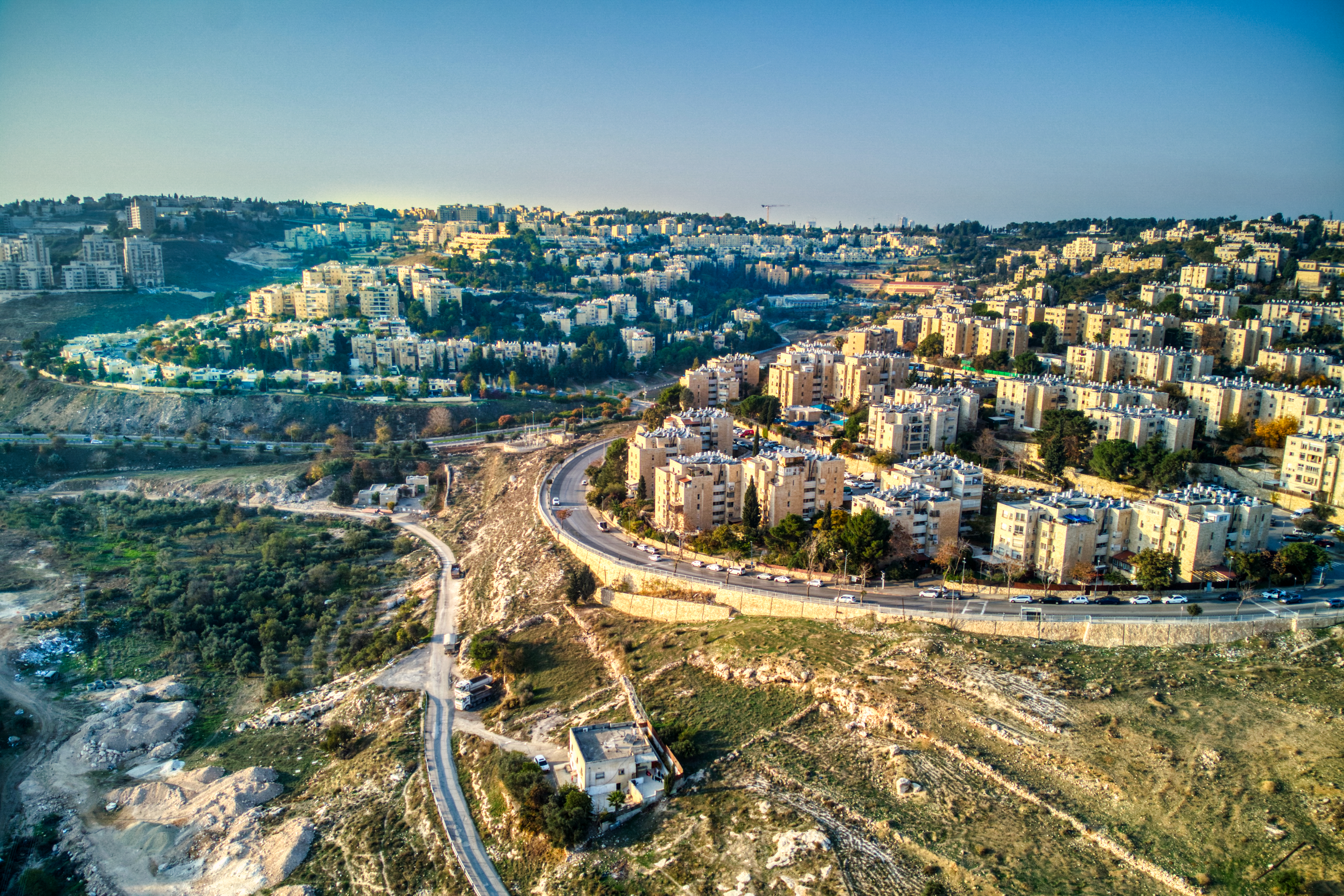
East Talpiot

The Ring Neighborhoods (Israeli term; Hebrew: שכונות הטבעת) or Ring Settlements of Jerusalem are eight Israeli settlements built as suburban satellites to East Jerusalem. The first neighborhoods built after 1967 were Ramot, French Hill, Neve Yaakov, Pisgat Ze'ev, East Talpiot, and Gilo. In the 1990s, Ramat Shlomo and Har Homa were added to the list. The international community does not recognize Israeli sovereignty over East Jerusalem and considers the neighborhoods illegal settlements, but the Israeli government disputes this.

== History and legal status ==
In 1967, following the Six-Day War, the makeup of Jerusalem was altered. Plans were drawn up to establish new residential neighborhoods on undeveloped land around Jerusalem as a housing solution for young couples, new immigrants, and middle-class families seeking a better quality of life. The city's territory was increased to 108 km^{2} (42 sq mi) when Israel unilaterally annexed areas north, east and south of the city to Israel, totaling an area three times the size of pre-war West Jerusalem. Today, as many as 165,000 people reside in these communities. According to the United Nations and the European Union, due to their having been built beyond the Green Line, the neighborhoods Israel subsequently built on these annexed grounds are considered to be Israeli settlements, leading them to be considered illegal under international law based on the Fourth Geneva Convention and United Nations Security Council Resolution 476. Israel disputes this, maintaining that these neighborhoods are part of the municipality of Jerusalem, and therefore under Israel's sovereignty. The United States' position has been inconsistent. The United States abstained from voting on Resolution 476 and the US Congress has declared that "Jerusalem should remain an undivided city... the capital of the State of Israel" in the Jerusalem Embassy Act. On the other hand, the Obama administration stated that East Jerusalem settlements must halt construction and expansion permanently. Canada has also shown wavering stances regarding the neighborhoods, by using ambiguous wording or refusing to outwardly classify the neighborhoods as illegal West Bank settlements.

== Neighborhoods ==
- Ramot is located north-west, north of Highway 1. Established in 1974, it has about 50,000 residents as of 2015.
- Ramat Shlomo, due north of downtown, was established in 1995. It has an almost entirely Haredi population of 20,000 as of 2014.
- Neve Yaakov is the northernmost neighborhood in Jerusalem. Established in 1970, it has about 30,000 residents as of 2014.
- Pisgat Ze'ev in the north is the largest neighborhood in Jerusalem. Established in 1982, it has about 50,000 residents.
- French Hill in the north-east was established in 1968. It has a population of over 6,600 residents.
- East Talpiot (East of Talpiot) is located on the eastern edge of the city, situated near the Commissioner's Palace. Established in 1973, it has about 15,000 residents.
- Har Homa, in the far south-east, was established in 1997. It has about 20,000 residents.
- Gilo, south-west of the city, is the neighborhood with the highest elevation. Established in 1971, it has about 40,000 residents.

Another Jewish neighborhood in Jerusalem built beyond the Green Line, Ramat Eshkol (the first to be built), is not considered part of the Ring Neighborhoods.
