= Sur Baher =

Palestinian neighborhood in East Jerusalem

Sur Baher: צור באהר; صور باهر

Hebrew transcription(s)
  - Also spelled: Tsur Baher (unofficial)
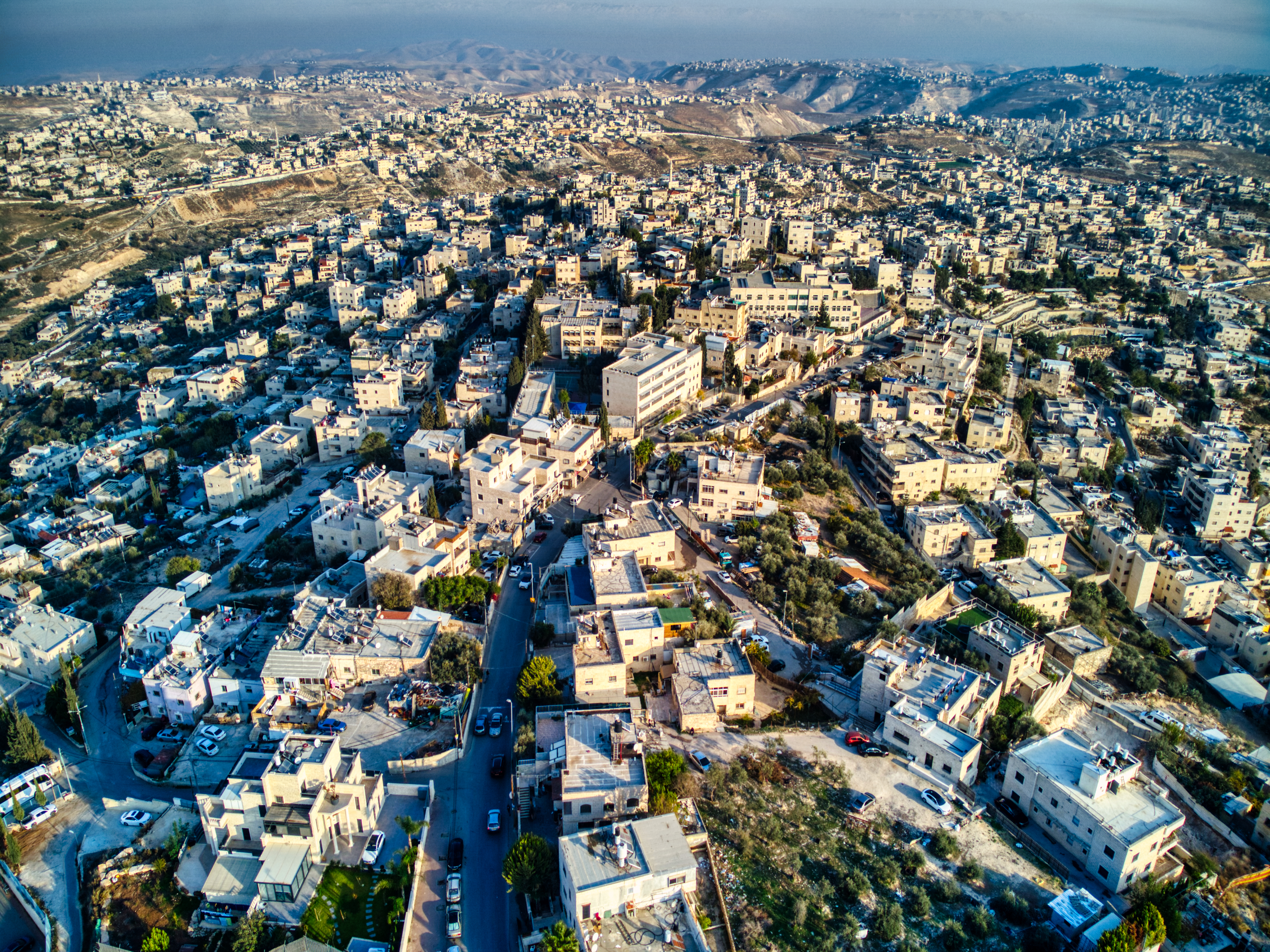
- Sur Baher

- Location of Sur Baher within Palestine
- Coordinates: 31°44′14″N 35°13′59″E
- Grid position: 172/127 PAL
- Jerusalem Municipality: Jerusalem

Population (2006)
  - Total: 15,000
- Name meaning: The wall of Bahir (Prominent)

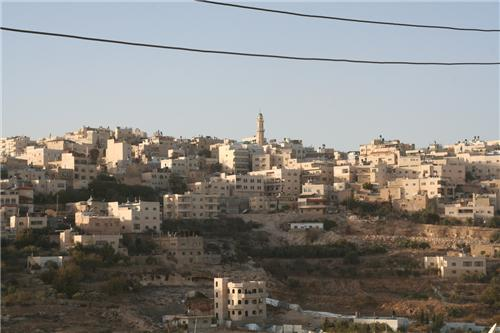
Sur Baher

Sur Baher (Arabic: صور باهر, Hebrew: צור באהר), also Tsur Baher, is a Palestinian neighborhood on the southeastern outskirts of East Jerusalem. It is located east of Ramat Rachel and northeast of Har Homa. In 2006, Sur Baher had a population of 15,000.

== History ==
=== Iron Age ===
During a general survey of the southern part of Sur Baher, ancient stone cut olive presses, wine presses, cisterns and a limekiln were found. A cave, with remains dating to the Iron Age I (12-11th centuries B.C.E.) were excavated at Khirbat Za‛kuka, south of Sur Baher.

=== Roman Empire ===
A burial cave, dating to the end of the first century BCE and the first century CE have also been excavated. The cave contained remains of several ossuaries, in addition to arcosolia and benches.

=== Byzantine Empire ===
Pottery vessels that dated to the Late Roman and Byzantine periods were excavated from an ancient quarry at Sur Baher. One mile straight to the east of Sur Baher tombs from the Byzantine era have been found. They were probably connected with the Georgian monastery at Umm Leisun.

=== Crusaders ===
In the Crusader era it was known as Casale Sorbael. In 1179 the village was mentioned as being among the villages whose revenue were given to the Mt. Zion Abbey by Pope Alexander III.

=== Ottoman Empire ===
Sur Baher, like the rest of Palestine, was incorporated into the Ottoman Empire in 1517, and in the tax registers of 1596 "Sur Bahir" appeared as being in the Nahiya of Quds in the Liwa of Quds. It had a population of 29 households, all Muslim. They paid a fixed tax-rate of 33.3% on agricultural products, including wheat barley, vineyards and fruit trees, goats and beehives; a total of 12,983 akçe. 15/24 of the revenues went to a waqf.

In 1838, Edward Robinson noted Sur Bahil N 13° E from Tuqu'. It was further noted as a Muslim village.

French explorer Victor Guérin visited the place in 1863, and described Sur Baher as having about 400 inhabitants. An Ottoman village list of about 1870 found 46 houses and a population of 154, though the population count only included men. It further noted that it was an old, well-built and nice-looking village.

In 1883, the Palestine Exploration Fund's Survey of Western Palestine described Sur Bahir as "a stone village of moderate size, on a bare hill. On the north is a well in the valley, and there are rock-cut tombs above it to the west."

In 1896 the population of Sur Bahir was estimated to be about 300 persons.

=== British Mandate ===
In the 1922 census of Palestine, conducted by the British Mandate authorities, Sur Baher had an all Muslim population of 993 persons. In the 1931 census the population of Sur Bahir was a total of 1529, still all Muslim, in 308 inhabited houses.

In the 1945 statistics the population of Sur Baher, together with Umm Tuba, was 2,450, all Muslims, who owned 8,915 dunams of land according to an official land and population survey. 911 dunams were plantations and irrigable land, 3,927 used for cereals, while 56 dunams were built-up (urban) land.

=== Jordan ===
During the 1948 Arab–Israeli War, Sur Baher was occupied and later annexed by Jordan.

In the 1961 Jordanian census, the population of Sur Baher was 2,335. Sur Baher's population together with Umm Tuba and Arab el Subeira amounted to 4,012 in the same census.

=== Israel ===
==== 20th century ====
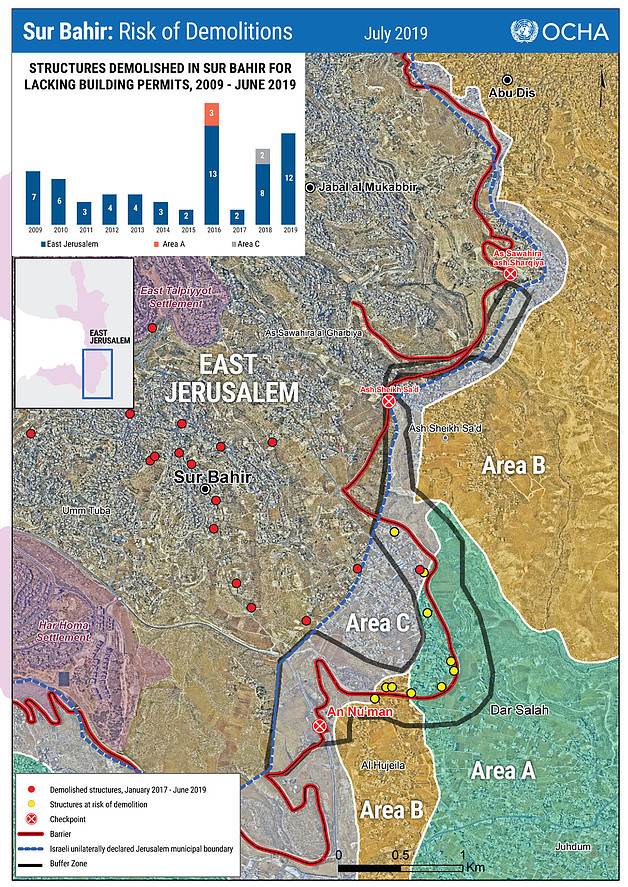
Structures at risk of demolition

Since the 1967 Six-Day War, Sur Baher came under Israeli occupation. The 1967 Israeli census showed there were 4,710 inhabitants in Sur Baher and Umm Tuba, an increase with 17.4% from the 1961 census.

Parts of the village have differing status, some is within the East Jerusalem boundary and some within the West Bank and a part is outside the boundary but still on the Israeli controlled side of the barrier wall.

Israel has divided Sur Bahir & Umm Tuba in two main parts: the western part, called "J1", (about 6,476 dunums (78.5% of the towns’ total area)) is under the control of the Jerusalem Municipality. The eastern part (1,769 dunums (21.5% of the towns’ total area)), called "J2", is divided into:

- 705 dunams, 40%, classified as Area A,
- 55 dunams, 3% as Area B,
- 1,009 dunams, 57% as Area C

Part of "J2" is inside the wall, part of it is outside.

According to ARIJ, Israel has confiscated land from Sur Bahir & Umm Tuba in order to construct two Israeli settlements: 1,343 dunams for East Talpiot, and 354 dunams for Har Homa.

In 1970, Israel expropriated land around the village used for livestock grazing and harvesting olive and citrus groves from its owners. Most of that land was utilized in the building of the Jerusalem Jewish only neighborhood/settlement of East Talpiot. According to Isabel Kershner, a fifth of Sur Baher's land was expropriated for East Talpiot, available land in the village became insufficient to meet the growing needs of the population, and it was difficult for Sur Baher residents to obtain building permits from the Jerusalem Municipality. Residents constructed homes on the remaining land in the Wadi al-Ain and Wadi al-Humus valleys across what is designated by Israel as the municipal border.

==== 21st century ====
In 2000, the Israeli government and Jerusalem municipality approved building plans for two new high schools and a youth center. In September 2005, the Jerusalem municipality, in cooperation with the Israel Defense Forces, cleared a Jordanian minefield in Sur Baher. The work, carried out by an Israeli company, was completed by October 2005. In May 2007, the municipality built two schools on the cleared land: a girls school attended by 800 students, and Ibn Rushd, a boys school attended by 700 students. Since 2013, even non-Israeli Palestinian residents of Sur Baher are entitled to the services of Bituah Leumi (the Israeli National Insurance Institute) and the associated state health care.

In response to the demolition on July 22, 2019, of up to 16 residential buildings in the neighbourhood of Wadi al-Hummus in the village of Sur Baher, Amnesty condemned the action stating: "These demolitions are a flagrant violation of international law and part of a systematic pattern by the Israeli authorities to forcibly displace Palestinians in the occupied territories; such actions amount to war crimes." OCHA provided background information on the situation in Sur Baher where the Barrier has been routed around Sur Bahir so that parts of Area A, B and C fall on the Jerusalem side but have not been incorporated within the municipal boundary, although they are now physically separated from the remainder of the West Bank.

== Sights of Sur Baher ==
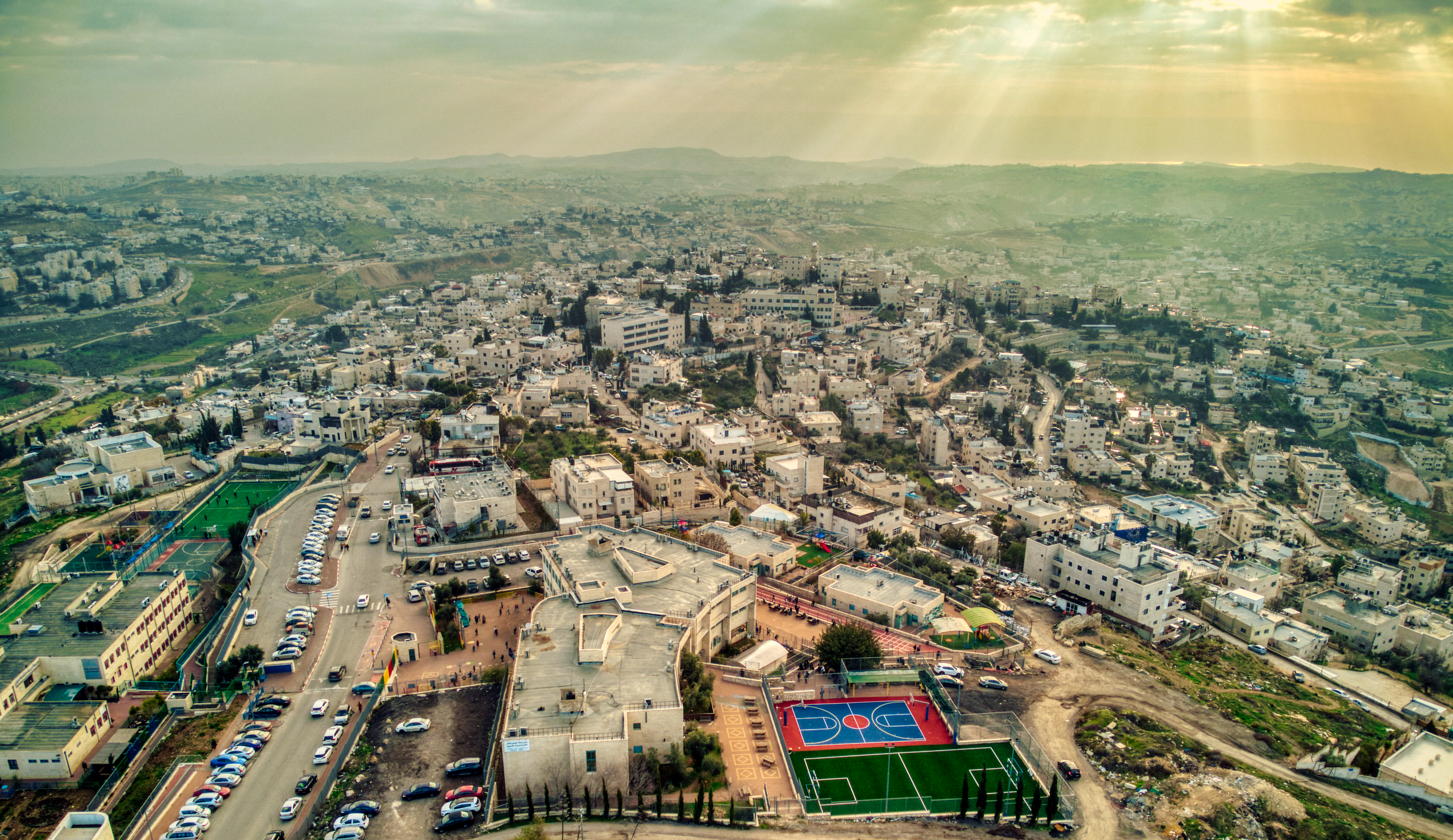

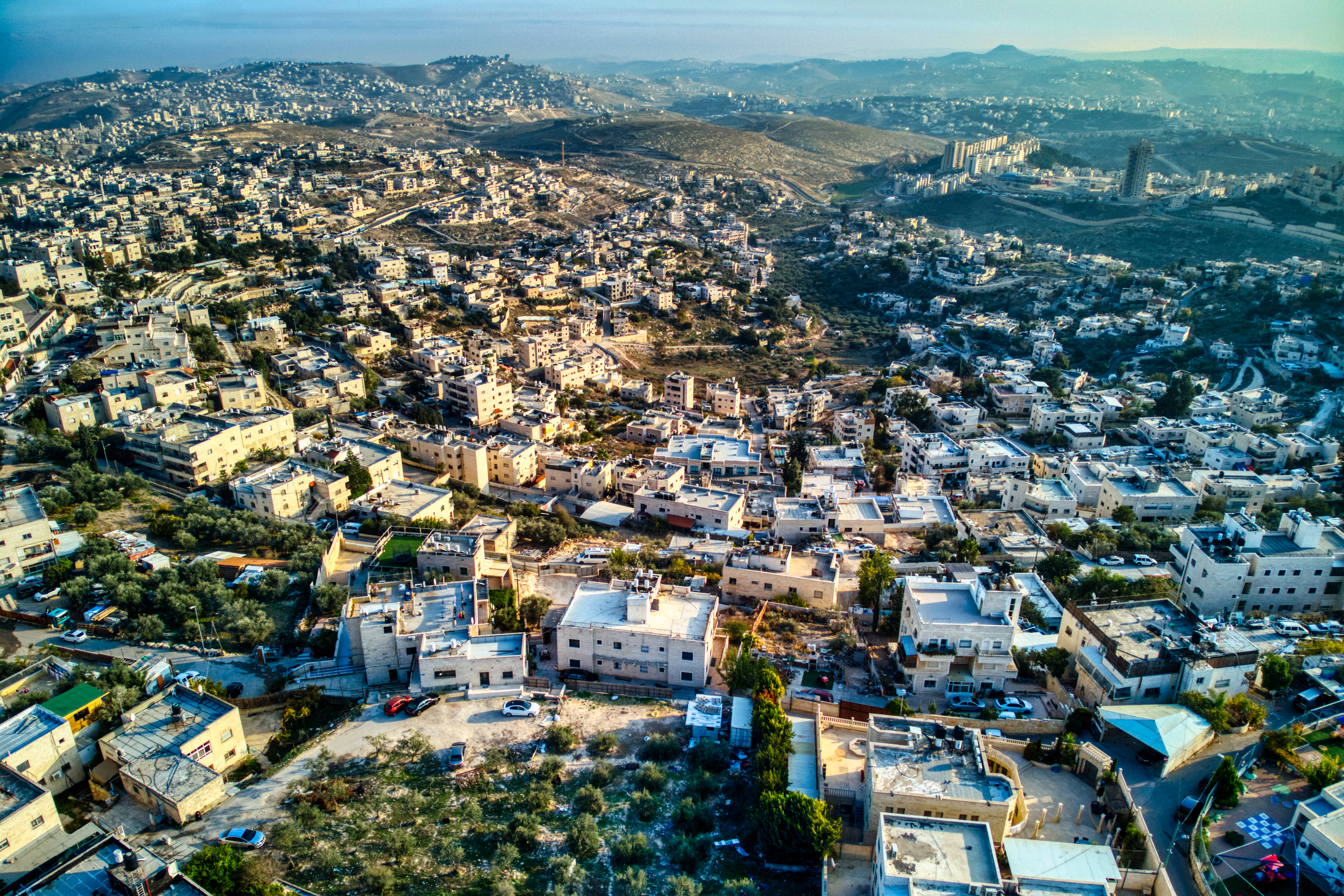

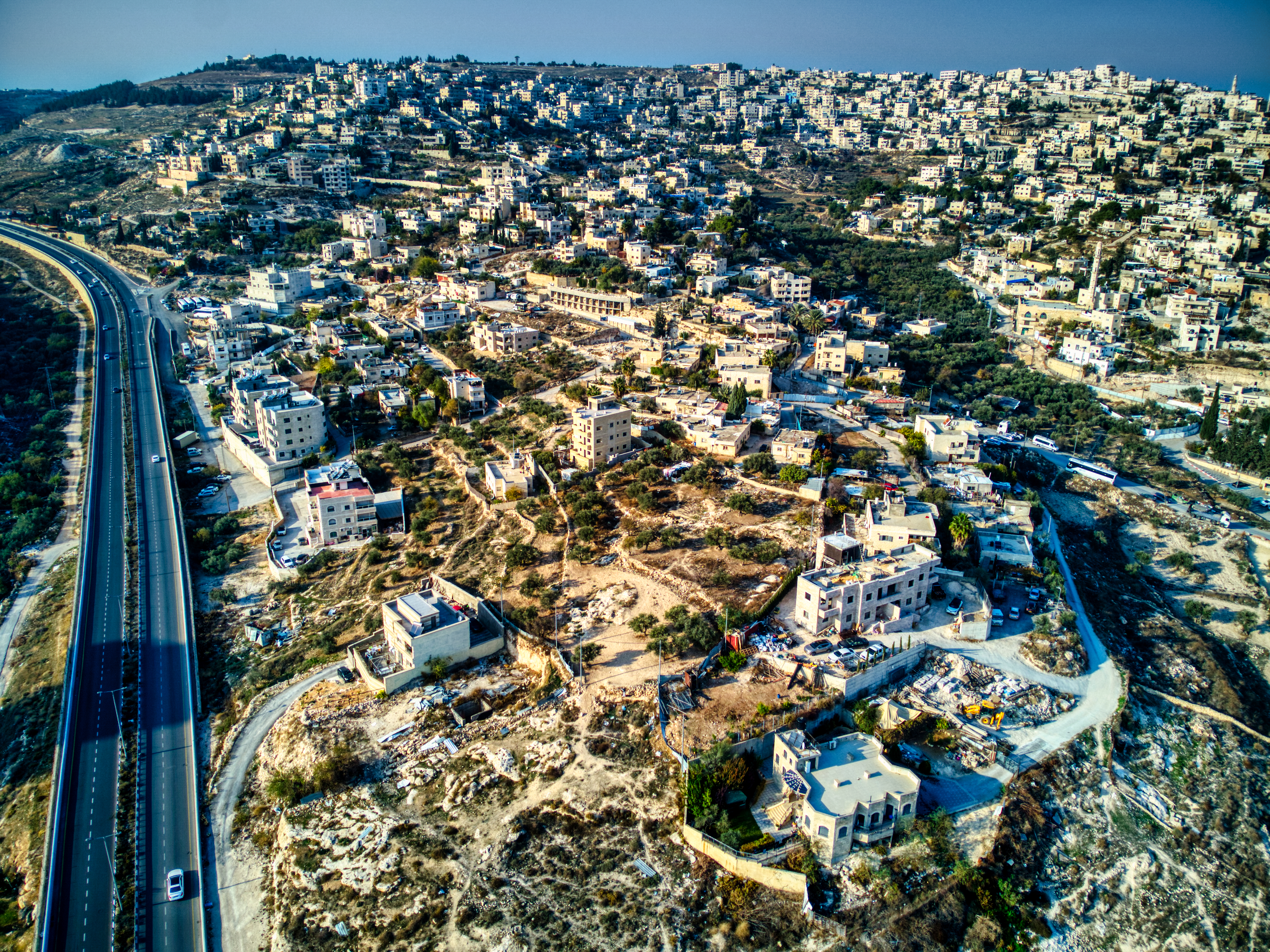

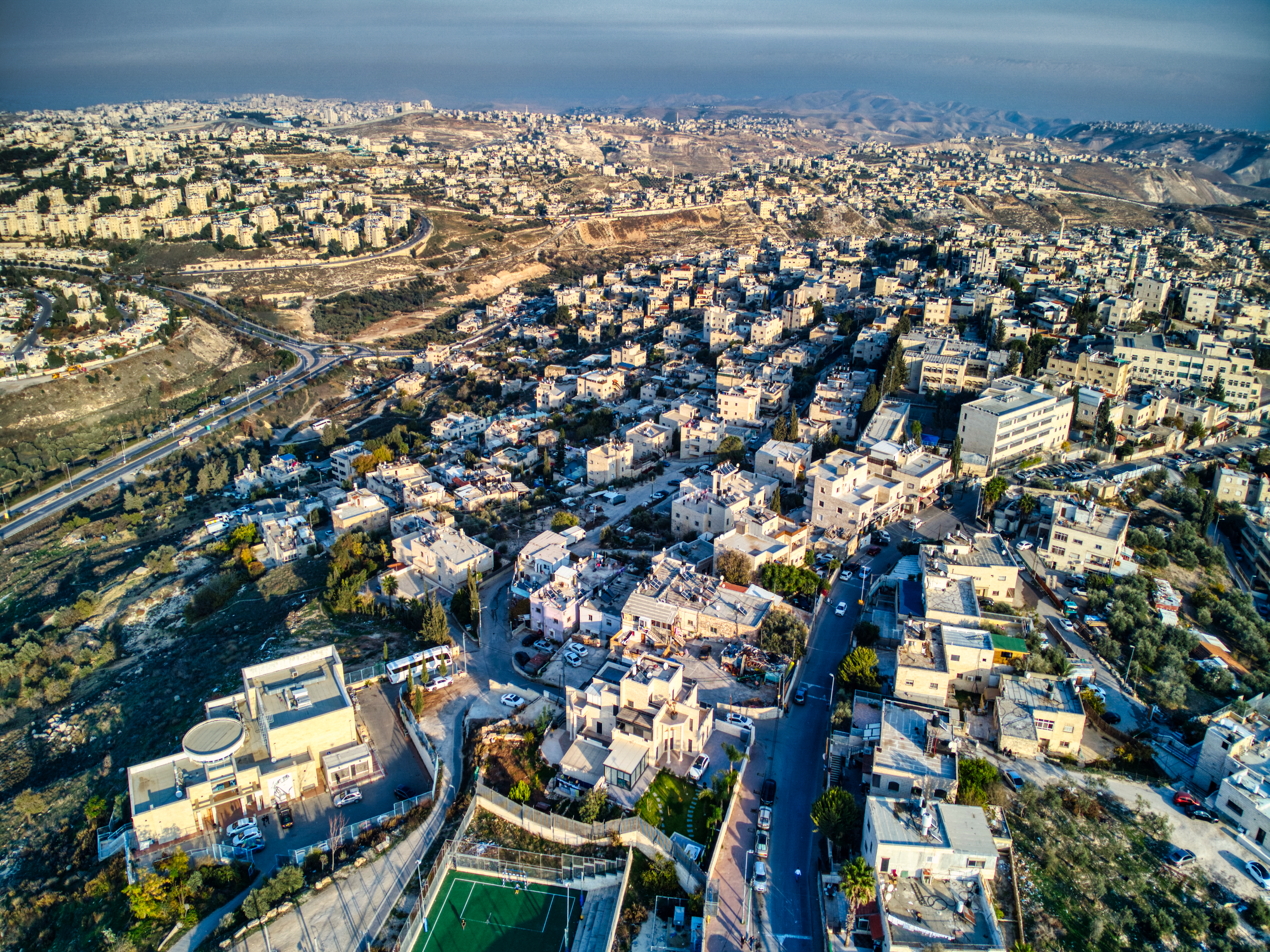

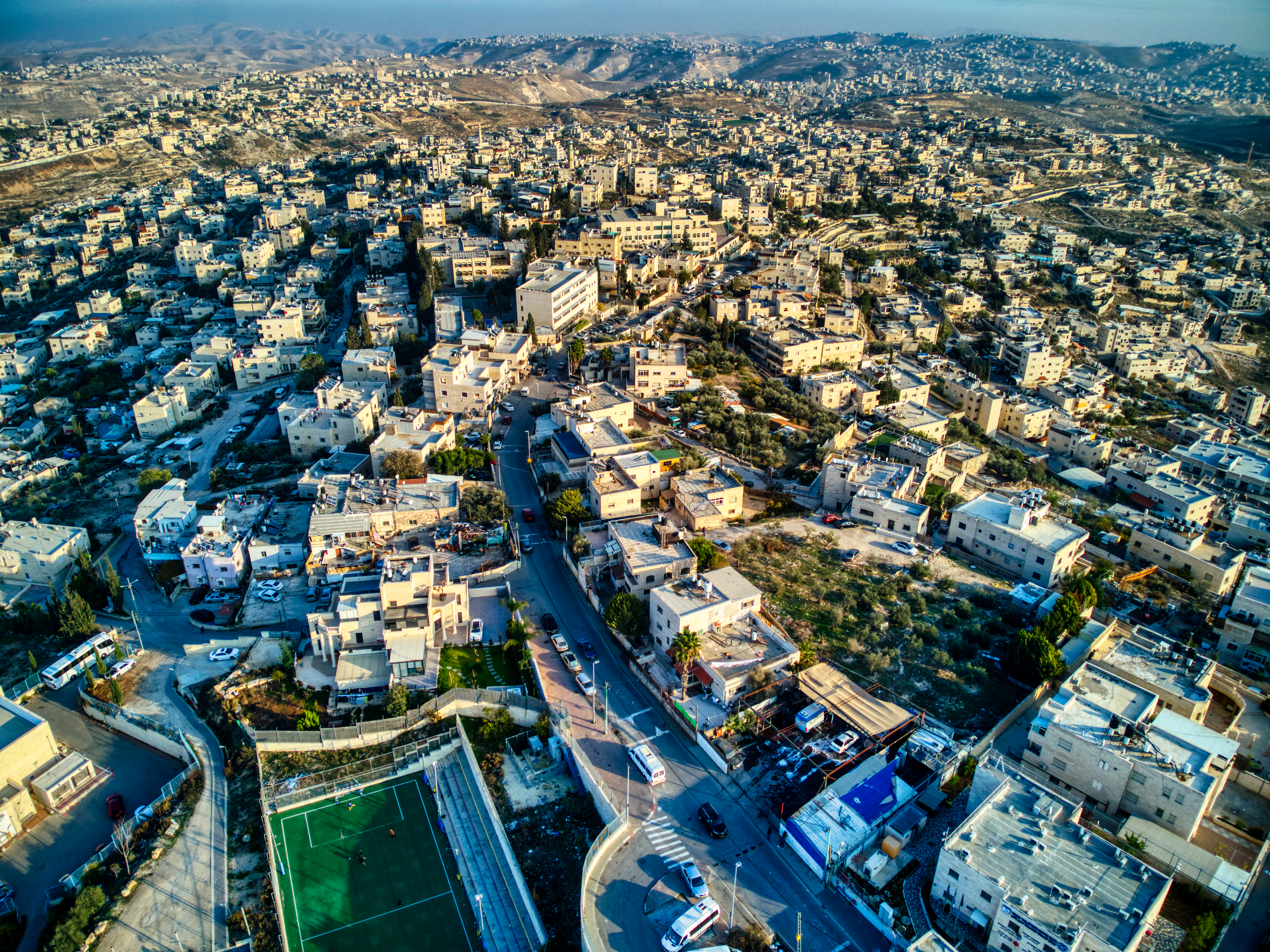

== Bibliography ==
- ‘Adawi, Zubair (2010-01-19). "Jerusalem, Sur Bahir, Final Report". Hadashot Arkheologiyot – Excavations and Surveys in Israel (122).
- ‘Adawi, Zubair (2014-08-07). "Jerusalem, Khirbat Za'kuka (Sur Bahir) Final Report". Hadashot Arkheologiyot – Excavations and Surveys in Israel (126).
- Barron, J.B., ed. (1923). Palestine: Report and General Abstracts of the Census of 1922. Government of Palestine.
- Bliss, F.J. (1898). Excavations at Jerusalem. London: Committee of the Palestine exploration fund.
- Clermont-Ganneau, C.S. (1899). [ARP] Archaeological Researches in Palestine 1873-1874, translated from the French by J. McFarlane. Vol. 1. London: Palestine Exploration Fund. (pp. 457 -459)
- Conder, C.R.; Kitchener, H.H. (1883). The Survey of Western Palestine: Memoirs of the Topography, Orography, Hydrography, and Archaeology. Vol. 3. London: Committee of the Palestine Exploration Fund.
- Dagan, Yehuda; Barda, Leticia; ‘Adawi, Zubair (2009-12-13). "Jerusalem, Sur Bahir, Survey Final Report". Hadashot Arkheologiyot – Excavations and Surveys in Israel (121).
- Ganor, Amir; Klein, Alon (2011-09-12). "Sur Bahir, Survey Final Report". Hadashot Arkheologiyot – Excavations and Surveys in Israel (123).
- Government of Jordan, Department of Statistics (1964). First Census of Population and Housing. Volume I: Final Tables; General Characteristics of the Population (PDF).
- Government of Palestine, Department of Statistics (1945). Village Statistics, April, 1945.
- Guérin, V. (1869). Description Géographique Historique et Archéologique de la Palestine (in French). Vol. 1: Judee, pt. 3. Paris: L'Imprimerie Nationale.
- Hadawi, S. (1970). Village Statistics of 1945: A Classification of Land and Area ownership in Palestine. Palestine Liberation Organization Research Center.
- Hartmann, M. (1883). "Die Ortschaftenliste des Liwa Jerusalem in dem türkischen Staatskalender für Syrien auf das Jahr 1288 der Flucht (1871)". Zeitschrift des Deutschen Palästina-Vereins. 6: 102–149.
- Hütteroth, W.-D.; Abdulfattah, K. (1977). Historical Geography of Palestine, Transjordan and Southern Syria in the Late 16th Century. Erlanger Geographische Arbeiten, Sonderband 5. Erlangen, Germany: Vorstand der Fränkischen Geographischen Gesellschaft. ISBN 3-920405-41-2.
- Kershner, I. (2005). Barrier: The Seam of the Israeli-Palestinian Conflict. Macmillan. pp. 143–145. ISBN 9781403968012.
- Mills, E., ed. (1932). Census of Palestine 1931. Population of Villages, Towns and Administrative Areas. Jerusalem: Government of Palestine.
- Mizrahi, Sivan (2013-12-08). "Jerusalem, Khirbat Umm Leisun". Hadashot Arkheologiyot – Excavations and Surveys in Israel (125).
- Palmer, E.H. (1881). The Survey of Western Palestine: Arabic and English Name Lists Collected During the Survey by Lieutenants Conder and Kitchener, R. E. Transliterated and Explained by E.H. Palmer. Committee of the Palestine Exploration Fund.
- Rey, E.G. (1883). Les colonies franques de Syrie aux XIIme et XIIIme siècles (in French). Paris: A. Picard.
- Robinson, E.; Smith, E. (1841). Biblical Researches in Palestine, Mount Sinai and Arabia Petraea: A Journal of Travels in the year 1838. Vol. 2. Boston: Crocker & Brewster.
- Robinson, E.; Smith, E. (1841). Biblical Researches in Palestine, Mount Sinai and Arabia Petraea: A Journal of Travels in the year 1838. Vol. 3. Boston: Crocker & Brewster.
- Röhricht, R. (1887). "Studien zur mittelalterlichen Geographie und Topographie Syriens". Zeitschrift des Deutschen Palästina-Vereins (in German). 10. Leipzig: K. Baedeker: 195–344.
- Röhricht, R. (1893). (RRH) Regesta regni Hierosolymitani (MXCVII-MCCXCI) (in Latin). Berlin: Libraria Academica Wageriana.
- Schick, C. (1896). "Zur Einwohnerzahl des Bezirks Jerusalem". Zeitschrift des Deutschen Palästina-Vereins. 19: 120–127.
- Seligman, J. (2015). "A Georgian Monastery from the Byzantine Period at Khirbat Umm Leisun, Jerusalem". 'Atiqot. 83: 145–180.
- Socin, A. (1879). "Alphabetisches Verzeichniss von Ortschaften des Paschalik Jerusalem". Zeitschrift des Deutschen Palästina-Vereins. 2: 135–163.
- Toledano, E. (1984). "The Sanjaq of Jerusalem in the Sixteenth Century: Aspects of Topography and Population". Archivum Ottomanicum. 9: 279–319.
- Yeger, David (2015-12-31). "Jerusalem, Khirbat Umm Leisun". Hadashot Arkheologiyot – Excavations and Surveys in Israel (127).
