= Muhammad Abu Tir =

Palestinian politician (born 1951)

Member of the Palestinian Legislative Council
- Incumbent
- Assumed office 18 February 2006

Personal details
- Born: Muhammad Hassan Abu Tir; 1951 (age 74–75) Umm Tuba, East Jerusalem, Jordanian-administered West Bank, Palestine
- Party: Hamas
- Other political affiliations: Fatah (early 1970s)
- Occupation: Politician

Muhammad Hassan Abu Tir (Arabic: محمد حسن أبو طير, also known as-Sheikh Abu Mus'ab, 1951) is a Palestinian politician, a member of Hamas and a representative on the Palestinian Legislative Council (PLC) for his East Jerusalem constituency. He was elected to the position in the Palestinian legislative elections that were held on 25 January 2006. Abu Tir is known for his bright orange henna-dyed beard which separates him from most other politicians and members of his community. He tended to keep a low media profile before he was placed in Israeli prison for four years: On 29 June 2006, Abu Tir was arrested by Israeli military authorities in the 2006 Gaza–Israel conflict. He was held until June 2010, after which Israel ordered him to leave the country because he refused to resign from the Hamas legislature. In June 2010, he was rearrested after he failed to leave East Jerusalem.

== Early life ==
Abu Tir was born in Umm Tuba, a present neighborhood in East Jerusalem. Abu Tir joined Fatah some time in the early 1970s. Around this time, he was convicted of terror-related activities in Israel and subsequently joined the Muslim Brotherhood. He spent nearly 25 years in Israeli prisons, on and off, for directing terror activities against Israel, including the attempted poisoning in the early 1990s of Israel's water supplies and for directing the activities of Hamas's military arm, the Izz ad-Din al-Qassam Brigades. In 2005, prior to the elections, he was released after serving a term of nearly seven years in prisons. After his release, he was recruited by Hamas to head its national list following its Gaza leader, Ismail Haniyeh. He was most recently arrested and later detained for campaigning near Jerusalem's Damascus Gate after violating a ban that forbade the practice. He was interrogated and later released. The incident transformed Tir into a minor celebrity among the public in his constituency. This incident, in the end, contributed positively to his overall campaign.

== Political stance ==
As for his stance politically, he told Newsweek in 2006: "Stop your support for Israel...[s]top calling us terrorists. This policy creates a feeling of oppression. The feeling of oppression can lead to disaster."

In 2006, Abu Tir told The Globe and Mail that his primary objective would be to "...take Sharia [Islamic law] as a source for legislation" but at the same time told Newsweek International he "...will [would] not [directly] impose Sharia." He also told The Globe and Mail that he plans to reform the Palestinian public education system by introducing a more Islamic curriculum, and also plans on separating male and female students. However Tir did clarify that alcohol would not be banned and it would not be mandatory for women to wear the hijab, or head-cover.

Abu Tir also told the paper that as long as Israel continues its occupation of Palestinian land Hamas would continue its armed struggle against them. In an enigmatic statement in an interview prior to his getting elected, he stated that he would "negotiate [with Israel] better than the others [previous administrations], who negotiated for 10 years and achieved nothing." He explained that "We [Hamas] are not against the Jews. We are against occupation and oppression".

He noted further that Hamas had removed significant sections of their constitution which called for Israel's destruction, though the basic idea remains the same: Israel cannot be allowed to remain as a Jewish state in the Middle East. "In the past," he said, "it was said that we don't understand politics, only force, but we are a broad, well-grounded movement that is active in all areas of life. Now we are proving that we also understand politics better than the others." Abu Tir's final thought on Israeli negotiation was to leave it to the new parliament "as with every matter, to be discussed and decided upon in a rational manner". After Hamas's landslide victory in January 2006 many countries decided to back Israel's decision to cut foreign aid to the Palestinian Authority. After being asked what Hamas planned to do in light of this Abu Tir stated that Hamas "would not go to foreign donors on [a] bended knee". In a 6 February 2006 open letter to Newsweek International Tir stated that "The European Union and America should cooperate with us. We have ways of creating understanding among our people. We are facilitators, helpers, aides. The presence of Hamas is a guarantee of safety and stability in the region. Any money that is given to us will be channelled to the correct path." As he tried to address Western fears that donations would go to buy arms Tir told the West to "...[not] be afraid...we can always find arms on the black market. It is obvious that we have built our military infrastructure in that way. Our weapons are the only guarantee of our existence. If a proper Palestinian state were established, then all the militias would melt inside the Palestinian Army." Summing up his letter Tir attempted to ease western anxiety about Hamas by stating that "The West has nothing to fear from Hamas. We're not going to force people to do anything. We will not impose Sharia. Hamas is contained. Hamas deals only with the Israeli occupation. We are not Al Qaeda."

== 2006 and 2010 Arrests ==
On 25 June 2006, Israeli soldier Gilad Shalit was captured by Hamas, which initiated the 2006 Gaza–Israel conflict. A few days after the incident, on 29 June, Israel arrested 64 Hamas officials in the West Bank, including Palestinian Authority cabinet ministers and members of the Palestinian Legislative Council. Abu Tir was among them and was held in jail for four years.

Abu Tir was freed on 20 May 2010. He was subsequently stripped of his Israeli ID card and residency rights, and told by the Israeli Shin Bet intelligence service that he was banned from Jerusalem.

He was held under administrative detention for one year and released in May 2012, expelled to Ramallah and not allowed to enter Jerusalem.

== Orange beard ==
One of Abu Tir's most noticeable physical attributes and trademarks is his bright orange beard. The orange is henna, a natural dyestuff, which needs to be applied periodically in order to maintain its lustrous colour. In an interview with the Israeli Channel 10 television Abu Tir stated that he had decided to dye his beard with henna because Muhammad had done so and also because it was a remedy for headaches and dandruff. Islam bans the use of black hair dyes; however, there is no mention of a ban on the use of other colours.
