= East Talpiot =

Israeli settlement in East Jerusalem

Coordinates: 31.75°N 35.235°E

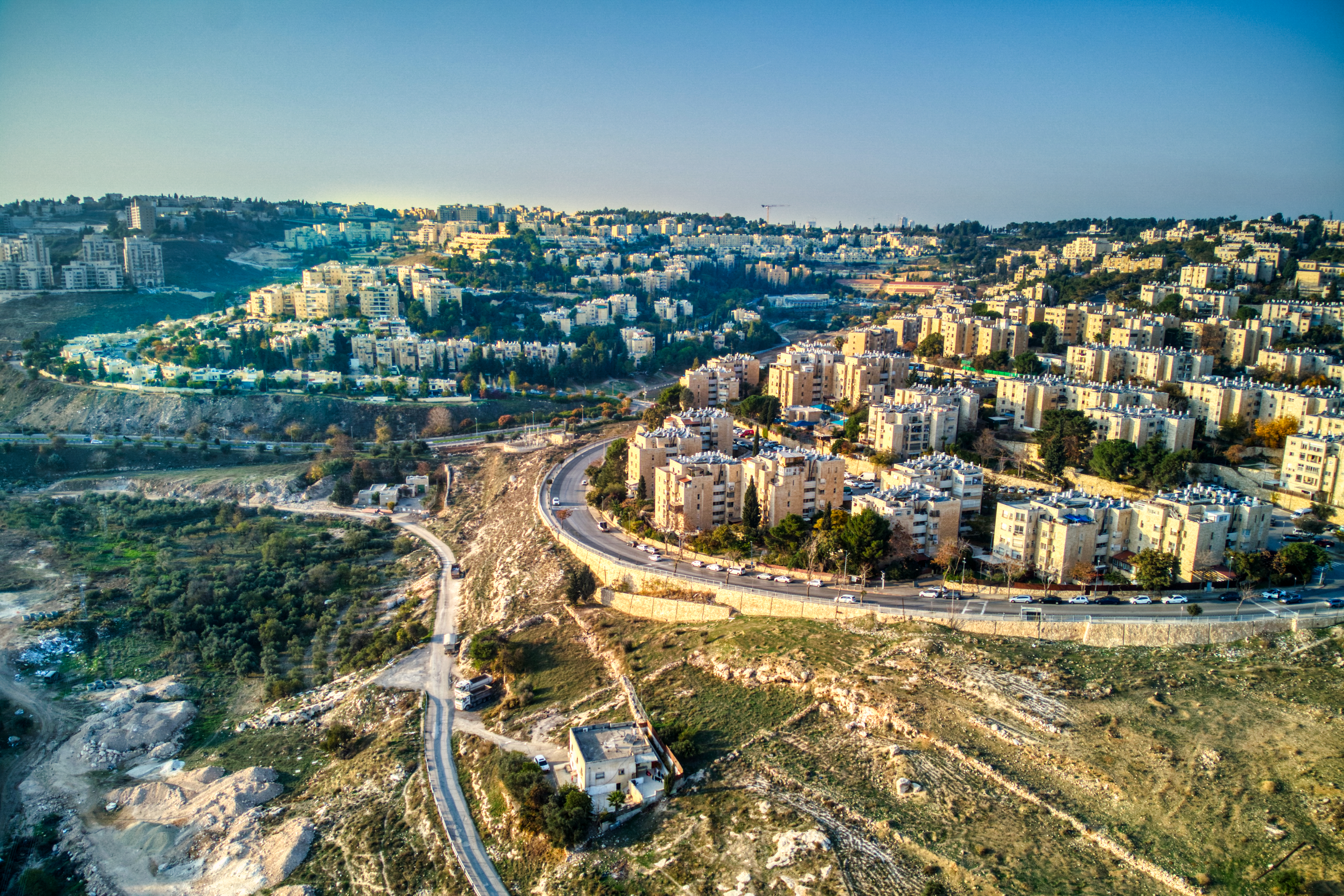
View of East Talpiot

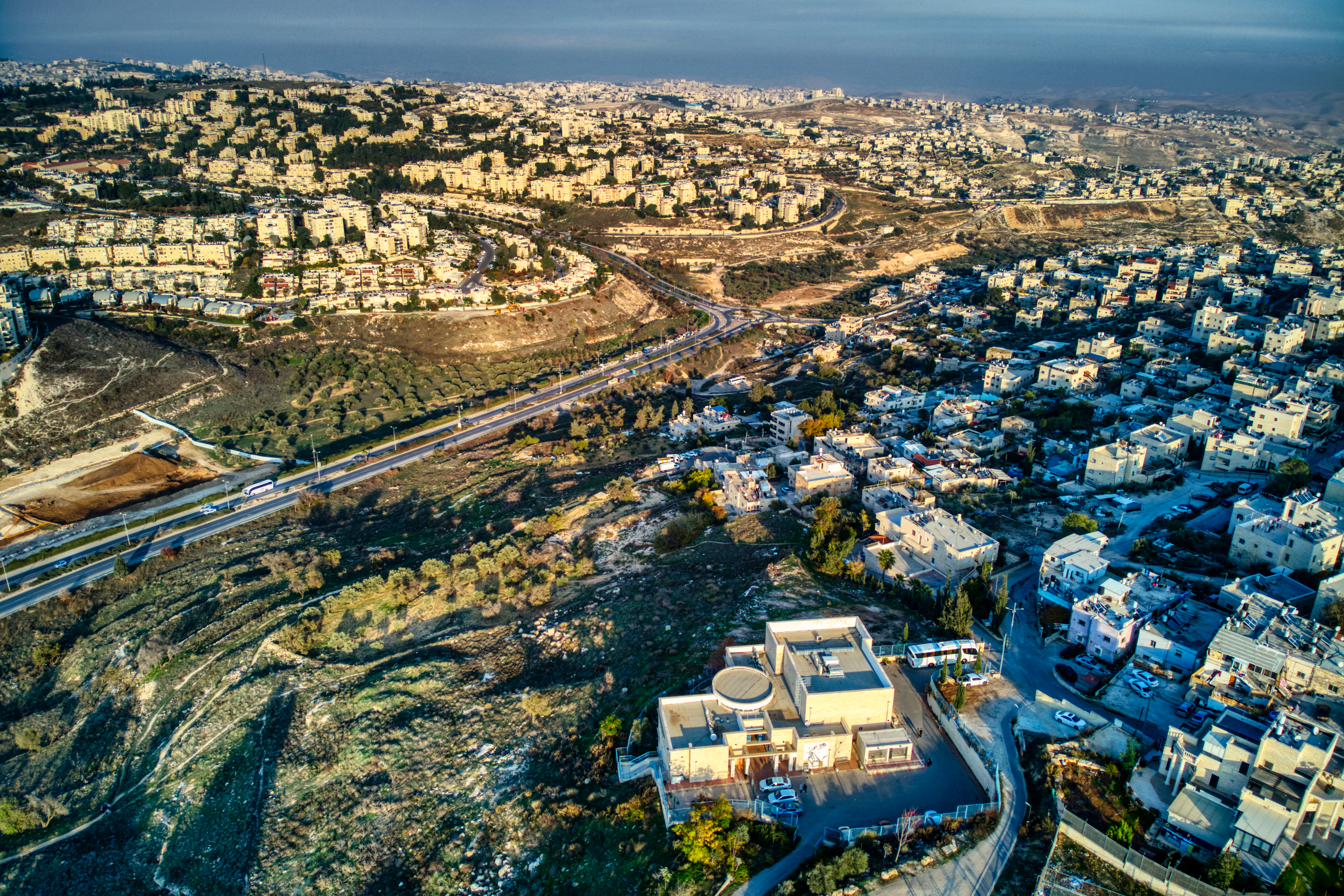
View of East Talpiot from Sur Baher, and in the background, Umm Leisun, Jabel Mukaber, as-Sawahira ash-Sharqiya. the Separation Barrier and behind it Abu Dis

East Talpiot (Hebrew: תלפיות מזרח Talpiot Mizrach) or Armon HaNetziv (ארמון הנְציב) is an Israeli settlement in southern East Jerusalem, established by Israel in 1973 on land captured in the Six-Day War and occupied since then. The international community considers East Talpiot to be an Israeli settlement that is illegal under international law. With a population of over 15,000 Israeli settlers, East Talpiot is one of Jerusalem's Ring Neighborhoods.

== History ==
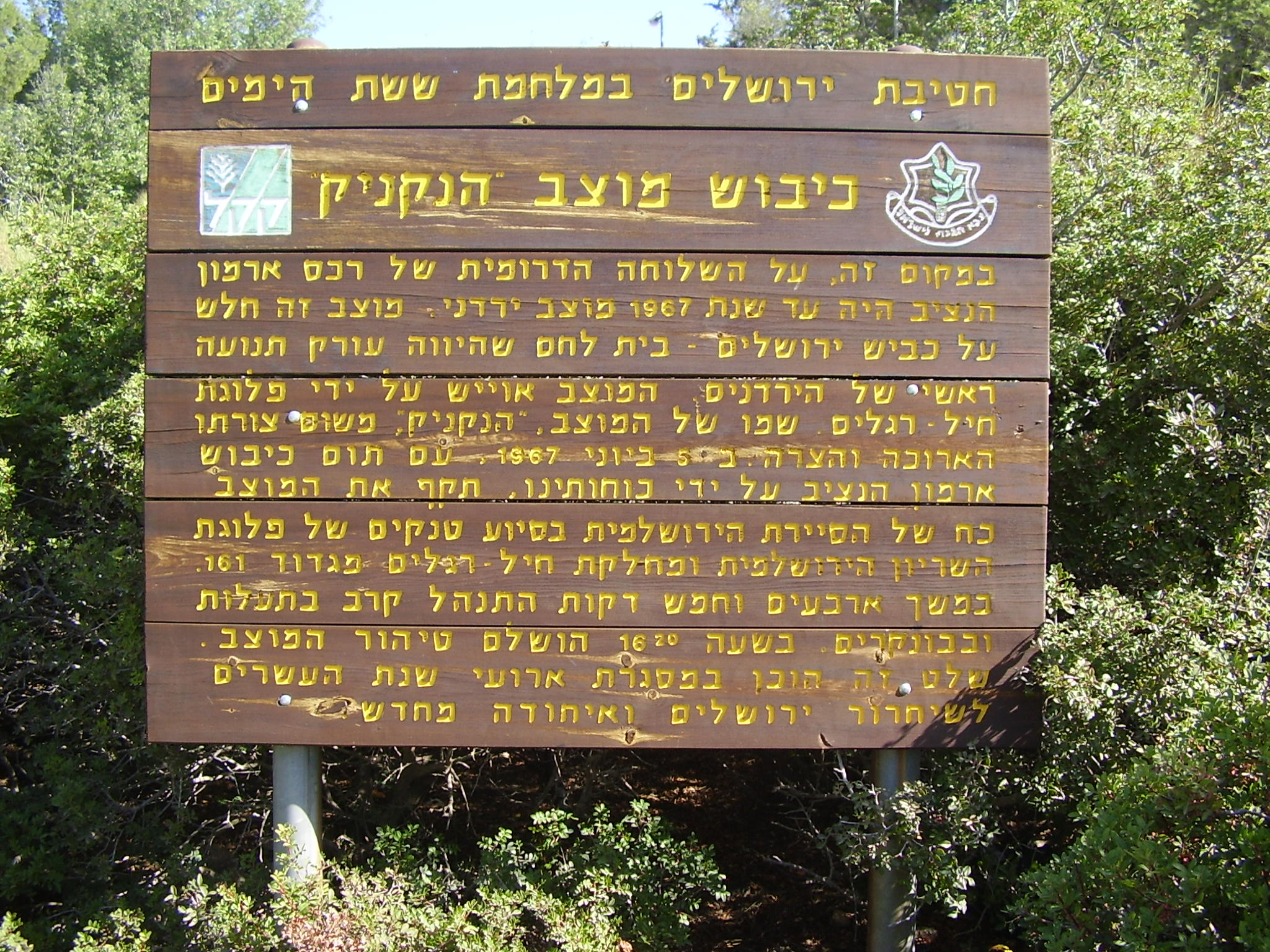
War memorial of the Six-Day War in east Talpiot

Before the new housing projects built after 1967, the area was known as Armon HaNetziv (lit. The Governor's Palace) after the headquarters of the British High Commissioner located on the hilltop. In 1928, Rachel Yanait Ben-Zvi, wife of Israel's second president Yitzhak Ben-Zvi, established an agricultural training farm for young women, the first of its kind in the country, in the area of East Talpiot. Both the farm and the Arab Girls College, another historical landmark, are earmarked for conservation. The Lili and Elejandro Shaltiel Community Center was inaugurated in 1980.

In the 1967 Six-Day War Israel captured and occupied East Jerusalem, East Talpiot was constructed as part of the 1968 Jerusalem Master Plan, which called for the creation of Jewish settlements around Jerusalem to cement Israeli control over the region. East Talpiot is situated in southern East Jerusalem, between the Palestinian villages of Sur Baher and Sawaher.

According to ARIJ, Israel confiscated land from nearby Palestinian neighborhoods/villages in order to construct East Talpiot:

- 1,343 dunams from Sur Baher,
- 544 dunams from Jabel Mukaber,

Beit Canada, an absorption center for new immigrants, is located in East Talpiot. Nearly all the streets of East Talpiot take their names from those of the Olei Hagardom, members of Irgun and Lehi hanged by the British.

== Demography ==
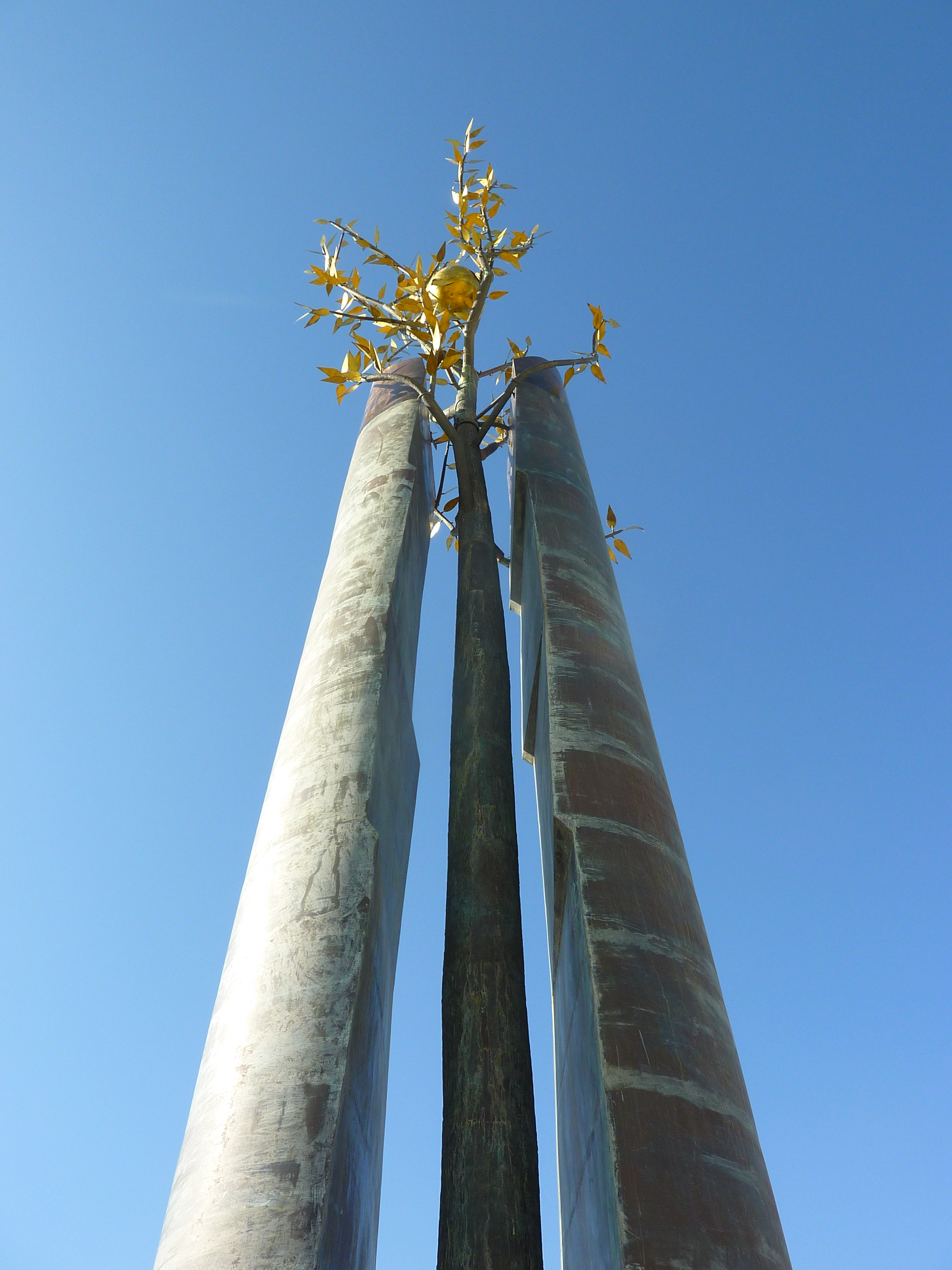
Monument to tolerance

In 2006, some 15,000 people were living in East Talpiot. Mainly populated by young couples when it was first established, the neighborhood is now aging. For the most part, East Talpiot is a secular neighborhood, with only 15 synagogues.

== Archeological findings ==
An excavation has found remains of a significant royal estate from the second half of the 7th century BC that archaeologists consider as indicative of a remarkable administrative development by the Kingdom of Judah during that century. An ancient aqueduct that brought water to the Temple Mount from springs located outside of Jerusalem was also discovered in East Talpiot. This waterworks, a highly sophisticated engineering feat, continued to function for more than two thousand years.

There have been claims that an ancient tomb discovered in East Talpiot when a housing project was being built in 1980 could be the tomb of Jesus and his family.

== Arab-Israeli conflict ==
On 8 January 2017, 4 Israeli soldiers were killed in the 2017 Jerusalem truck attack that took place on the Armon Hanatziv Esplanade.

== Status under international law ==
The international community considers Israeli settlements in East Jerusalem to be illegal under international law, violating the Fourth Geneva Convention's prohibition on the transfer of civilians into occupied territory. Israel however disputes that East Jerusalem is occupied territory and instead considers it to be annexed to its territory as part of the Jerusalem municipality. That annexation is unrecognized internationally and East Jerusalem is considered occupied territory by the international community. Israel does not consider East Talpiot or other Jewish settlements in East Jerusalem to be settlements and instead considers them neighborhoods of Jerusalem.

== See also ==
- Arnona
- Talpiot
