= Elim (place) =

Biblical location

Coordinates: 29°18′N 32°58′E

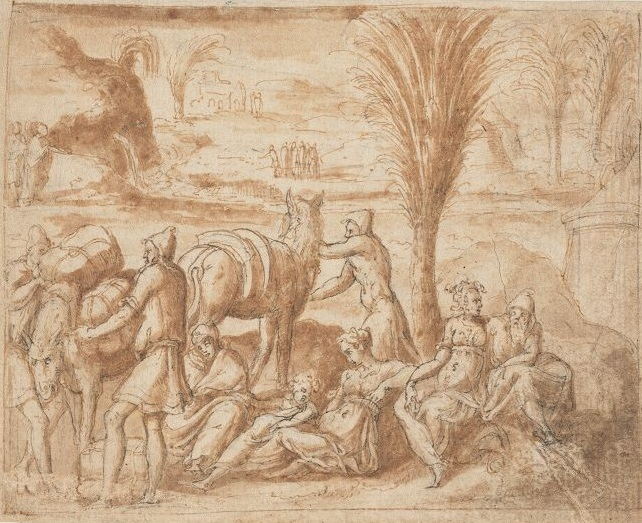
Depiction of the Hebrews camping in Elim, by Bernard Salomon, c. 1550

Elim (Hebrew: אֵילִם, romanized: ʾĒlīm), according to the Hebrew Bible, was one of the places where the Israelites camped following the Exodus from Egypt. It is referred to in Exodus 15:27 and Numbers 33:9 as a place where "there were twelve wells of water and seventy date palms," and that the Israelites "camped there near the waters".

From the information that can be gleaned from Exodus 15:23, 16:1, and Numbers 33:9-11, Elim is described as being between Mara and the Wilderness of Sin near the eastern shore of the Red Sea. It was possibly south of the Israelites' crossing point, and to the west of the Wilderness. Thus, Elim is generally thought to have been located in Wadi Gharandel, an oasis 100 km southeast of Suez.

Professor Menashe Har-El of Tel Aviv University (1968) has proposed Elim to be the ʿUyūn Mūsa "springs of Moses", now in South Sinai Governorate, Egypt. He noted that in 1907, the geologist Thomas Barron had observed that twelve springs existed at this site along with date palms. Professor James K. Hoffmeier disagrees on the basis that it is too close to the preceding site (seven miles/twelve kilometres) and would require the next four sites (using the Numbers itinerary) to be compressed into only 38 kilometres.

Exodus 16:1 records that the Israelites left Elim "on the fifteenth day of the second month after their departure from the land of Egypt", heading towards the biblical Mount Sinai through the Wilderness of Sin. Since the Israelites left Pi-Ramesses at midnight on the 14th/15th of the first month according to Exodus 12:18, 29, it was a month after this when they departed Elim for Mount Sinai.

== See also ==
- Oyun Musa
