= Har Homa =

Israeli settlement in East Jerusalem

Coordinates: 31°43′31″N 35°13′18″E

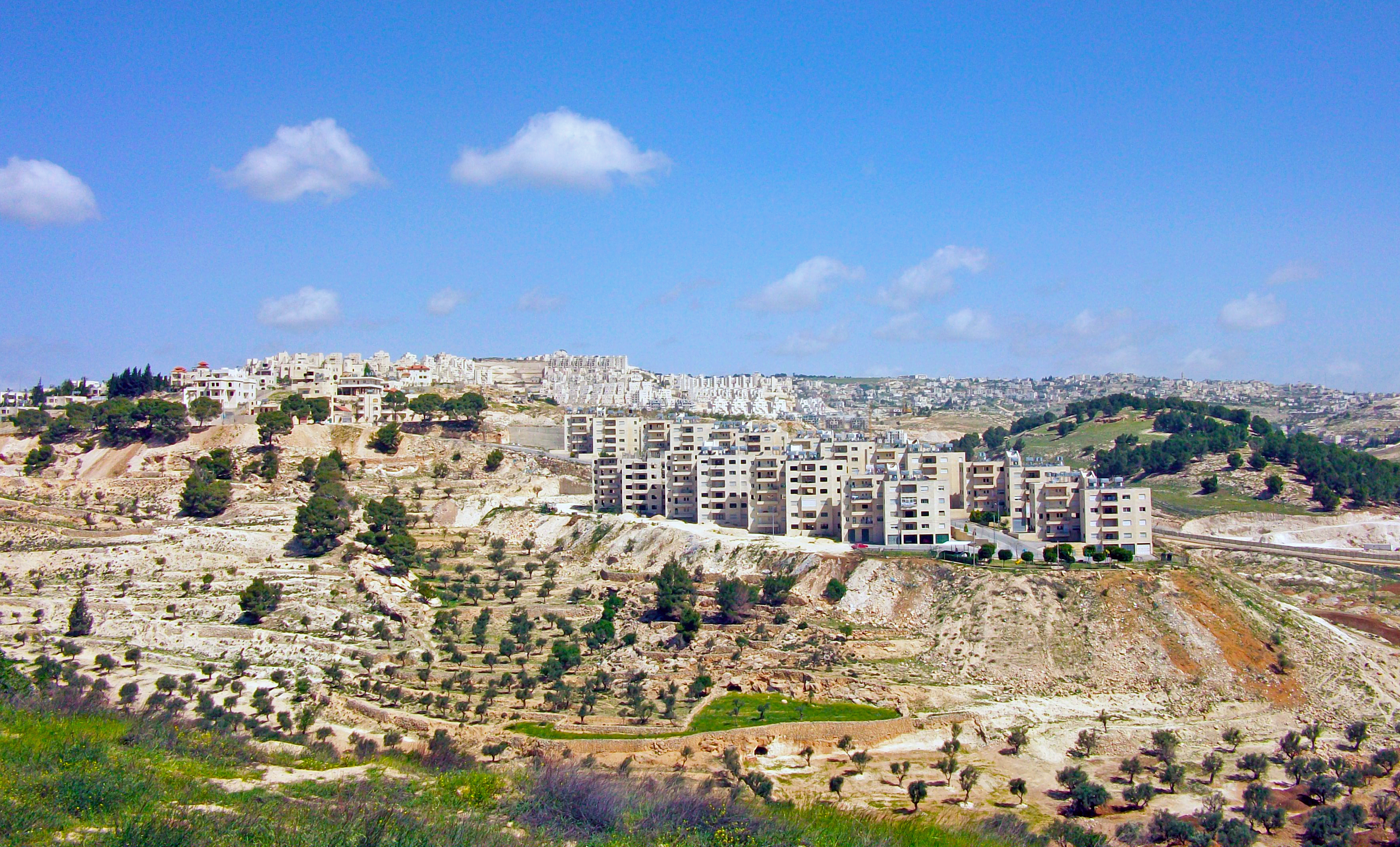
View of Har Homa from Beit Sahour

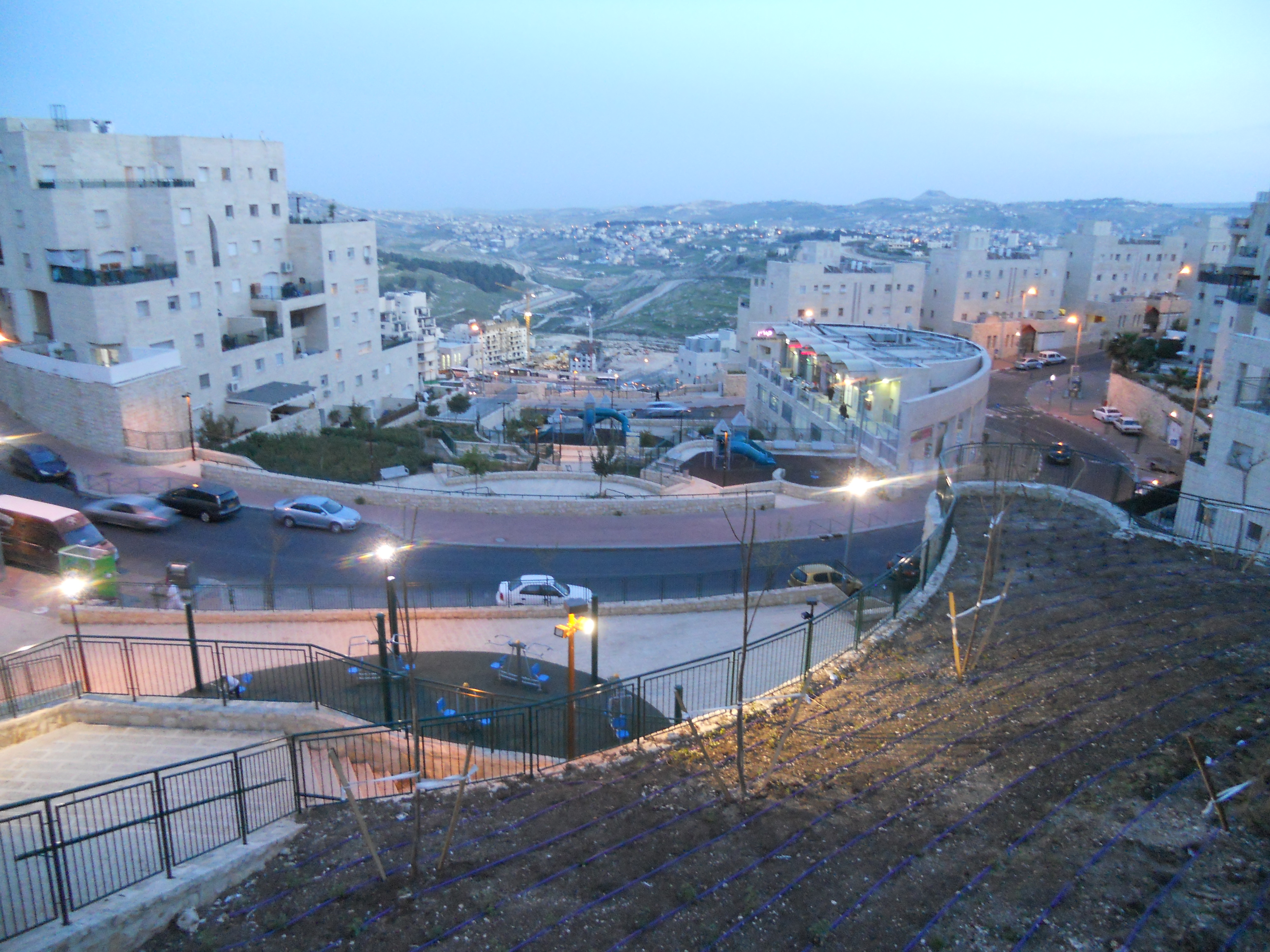
Har Homa

Har Homa (Hebrew: הר חומה, lit Wall Mountain), officially Homat Shmuel, is an Israeli settlement in southern East Jerusalem, near the Palestinian city of Beit Sahour. The settlement is also referred to as "Jabal Abu Ghneim" (also "Jabal Abu Ghunaym"), which is the Arabic name of the hill. One purpose given for the decision approving of its establishment was to obstruct the growth of the nearby Palestinian city of Bethlehem.

The settlement was officially renamed Homat Shmuel in 1998 after Shmuel Meir, a former deputy mayor of Jerusalem, who played an active role in its development before he was killed in a car accident in 1996.

In 2013, Har Homa had a population of 25,000.

Built on 1,850 dunams (1.85 km^{2}) of land Israel expropriated in 1991, the international community considers Israeli settlements in East Jerusalem illegal under international law, but the Israeli government disputes this.

== History ==
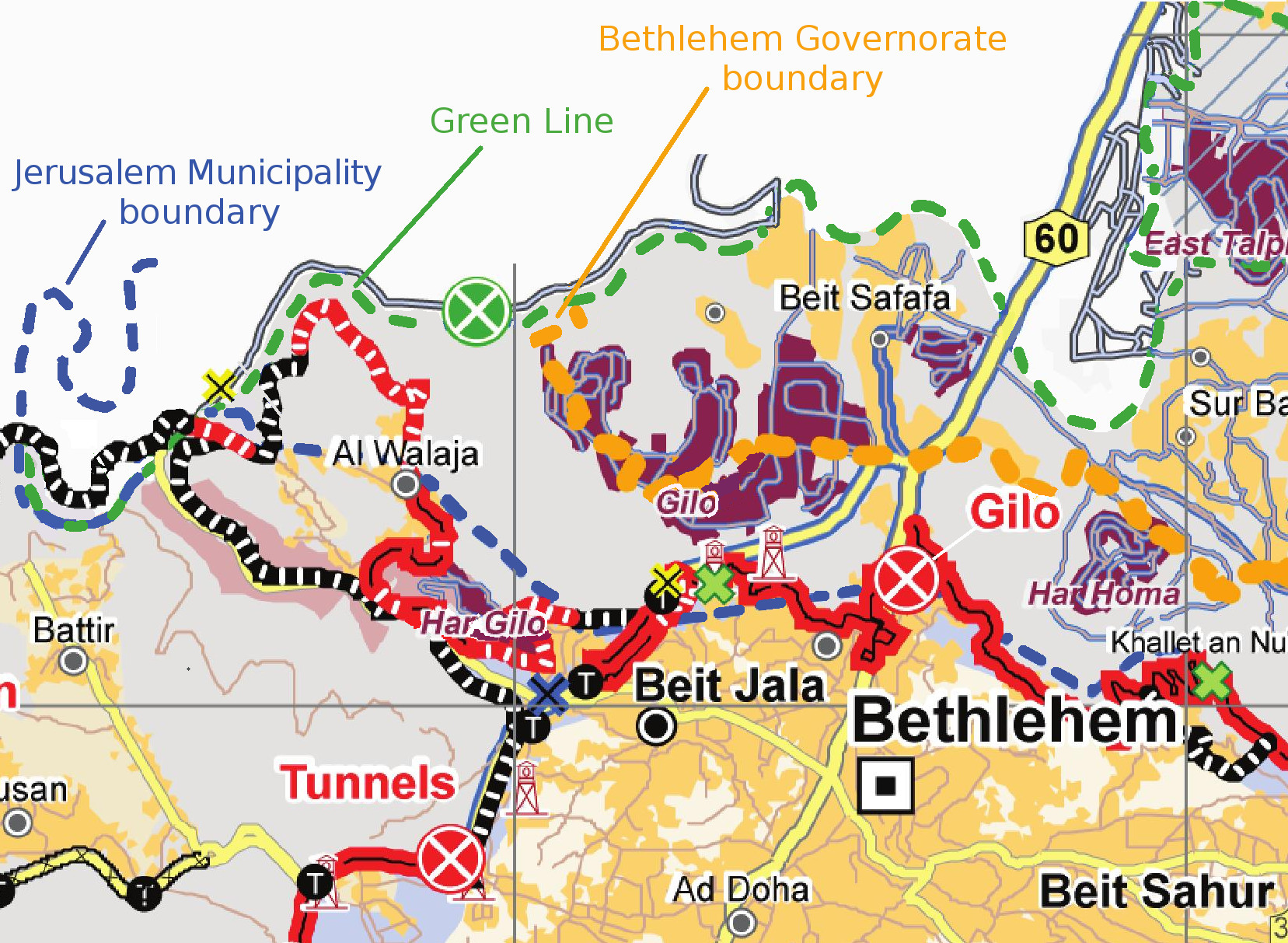
Map of the Gilo region/Har Homa

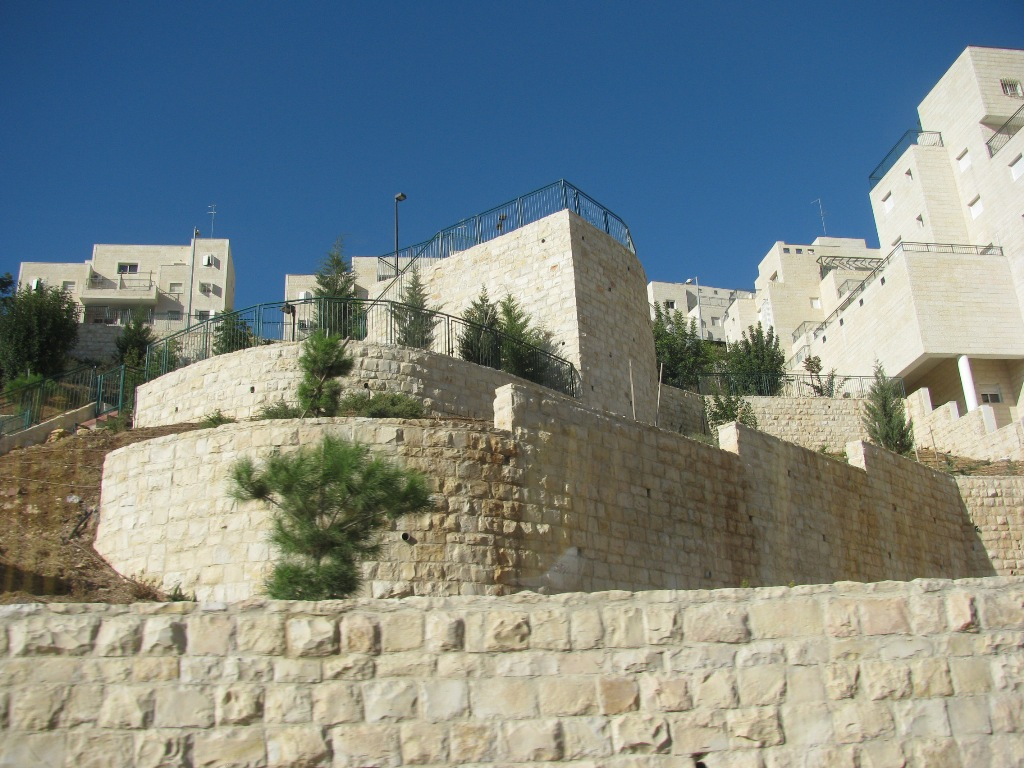
Terraced construction in Har Homa using Jerusalem stone

=== Post-1967 ===
Since the Six-Day War in 1967 the area has been under Israeli occupation.

According to ARIJ, Israel expropriated 354 dunams of land from Umm Tuba for Har Homa in 1997, while from 1997 onward, Israel expropriated hundreds of dunams of Beit Sahour land for the same purpose.

Plans for residential development were drawn up in the 1980s, but were opposed by Israeli environmental groups working to preserve the open areas in Jerusalem. A primary aim was to complete the continuous Israeli encirclement in East Jerusalem by stopping a perceived 'hole' in this area, and thus hinder Palestinian development that would create linkage between Beit Sahour and Sur Baher. In 1991, Israeli cabinet minister Yitzhak Moda'i approved expropriation of the land, which was owned by a variety of private owners, both Israeli and Palestinian, on the basis of eminent domain for new building projects conforming to a master plan. Both Israeli and Palestinian landowners protested the land seizures and appealed to the Israeli Supreme Court, which denied their claims and ruled in favor of the government. The major landholder was David Meir, who then made an alliance with the Arabs whose land had been expropriated to block the development.

Part of the original land is said also to have been owned by the Greek Orthodox Church and allegedly either sold or leased after severe pressure was applied by Israel on church authorities.

After the first land expropriations in 1995, Arab states brought the case before the UN Security Council. In May 1995, a draft resolution condemning Israel was vetoed by the US. Israeli Prime Minister Shimon Peres initially approved construction plans for Israeli homes on the site, but postponed the groundbreaking ceremony to avoid conflict with Palestinians who were seeking to overturn the decision in the Israeli courts. In July 1995, the government decided not to proceed with construction.

On 19 February 1997, the newly elected Benjamin Netanyahu government approved the construction of the settlement. The Arab states again went to the Security Council. The General Assembly condemned Israel's actions, but two UNSC resolutions in March were again vetoed by the US. In March 1997, the Netanyahu government, which saw the construction of homes in Har Homa as a legitimate expansion of Jerusalem, eventually started the work. In March 2015, Netanyahu said that "we had to protect the southern gateway to Jerusalem by building here" There were "huge objection" as Har Homa "is in a location which prevents the Palestinian (territorial) contiguity." In October 2014, Netanyahu approved the construction of 400 additional units.

In 2020, Netanyahu announced another 6,200 homes in Har Homa, in a move which was seen "as an effort to solidify right-wing support", just days before the Israeli 2020 election.

== Education and culture ==
In 2013, Har Homa had 12 kindergartens, 6 day care centers, 5 elementary schools, and 4 youth movement centers (Bnei Akiva, Ezra, Ariel and Beitar).

== Demography ==
Most of the residents of Har Homa today are young families who moved there in search of affordable housing. When the Jerusalem municipality approved the initial 2,500 housing units in Har Homa, it also approved 3,000 housing units and 400 government-financed housing units in the Arab neighborhood of Sur Baher, which faces Har Homa. The plans were drawn up in 1994, but the approval process was stepped up in May 1997 as a counterbalance to Israeli development at Har Homa. Palestinian officials dismissed the project as a ploy aimed at deflecting international criticism.

== Medical facilities ==
In 2013, Har Homa had 3 medical clinics.

== Transportation ==
Egged bus lines connect Har Homa to downtown Jerusalem, the Jerusalem Central Bus Station, the Malha Mall and Ramot.

== Controversy ==
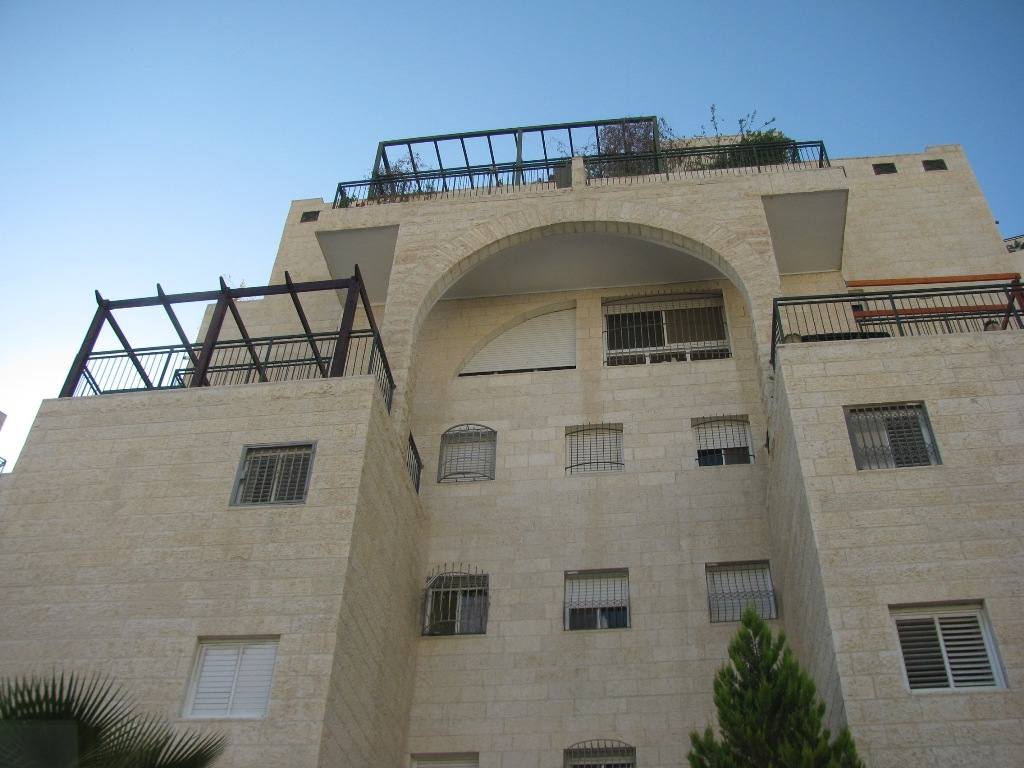
Typical architecture in Har Homa

Israeli officials acknowledged that some Palestinian land was expropriated for the Har Homa neighborhood, but said that nearly 80% of the land taken for the project belonged to Jews. According to FMEP, Israelis own approximately 75% of the land. One-third of it was purchased before 1948, and the remainder during the occupation after 1967. Palestinians owned approximately 33% of the planning area.

Israel's Ministry of Foreign Affairs claims that Har Homa is within Jerusalem, and construction work does not constitute a change in the status of Jerusalem, in accordance with the Oslo Accords.

== Views ==
=== Palestinian ===
Palestinians have for a long time thought that Israel attempted to tighten their control over Jerusalem by constructing Har Homa.

=== U.S. administration ===
In 1997, the U.S. vetoed two UN Security Council resolutions that called on Israel to stop construction work. The U.S. was the only country of the 15 members on the council to vote against the resolution. In a vote of 134 to 3, the United States, along with Israel and Micronesia, were the only countries among the 185 members in the UN General Assembly to vote against an April 1997 resolution demanding an immediate halt to construction at Har Homa. The previous month, a similar resolution condemning Israeli activity at Har Homa was passed 130 to 2, with only the U.S. and Israel voting against it.

While the United States has traditionally refrained from describing Jerusalem neighborhoods as settlements, in 2008, then U.S. Secretary of State Condoleezza Rice was critical of building tenders in Har Homa announced after the Annapolis Conference meeting. She described Har Homa as "a settlement the United States has opposed from the very beginning".

In November 2010, the United States criticized Israeli plans to build new housing units in Har Homa.

=== European Union ===
In 2011, then EU foreign policy chief Catherine Ashton said she was disappointed to hear that Israel was planning to expand Har Homa. She said in a statement that "the European Union has repeatedly urged the government of Israel to immediately end all settlement activities in the West Bank, including in East Jerusalem. ... All settlement activities are illegal under international law".

== Archaeology ==
In 1997, archaeologists discovered a fifth-century Byzantine church near Har Homa whose octagonal design is thought to have been the inspiration for the Dome of the Rock. In the center of the church is a rock upon which Christians believe that Mary rested while on her way to Bethlehem to give birth to Jesus. The Church of the Kathisma (meaning "seat" in Greek) is mentioned in early Christian writings and was a pilgrimage site for Christians. The church was built by a Roman widow named Ikelia in the early fifth century. In the eighth century, the building was converted into a mosque. It was appears to have been used by both Christians and Muslims until its destruction, possibly in an earthquake in 749.
