= Wadi Gharandel =

Wadi Gharandel is a wadi in western Sinai, Egypt.

== Biblical associations ==
Some associate Wadi Gharandel with the biblical narrative of the Exodus, namely with Elim, the fourth station where the Israelites camped during their journey away from slavery in Egypt (Exodus 15:27, Numbers 33:9).

Bedouin traditions speak of flash floods in Wadi Gharandel, reminiscent of the re-flooding of the Red Sea in the Exodus narrative once the Israelites had passed through the sea on dry ground (Exodus 14). Edward Henry Palmer, the Palestine Exploration Fund's Secretary, undertaking work for the PEF's Sinai Survey in 1869, met with Bedouin who described such floods.
