= Netophah =

Biblical city

Netophah was a city or group of villages near the town of Bethlehem.

== Biblical Importance ==
Netophah is mentioned in 2 Samuel 23:28-29 as a home of some of David's finest men, and is also mentioned in Ezra 2:22 and 1 Chronicles 9:16 as a place to which the returning exiles came.

Although it is certain that the place was near Bethlehem, the modern site cannot be identified. Some scholars have identified it with modern-day Umm Tuba.

== See also ==
- Bethlehem
- Umm Tuba
