= Umm Tuba =

Village in East Jerusalem

Coordinates: 31°44′N 35°14′E

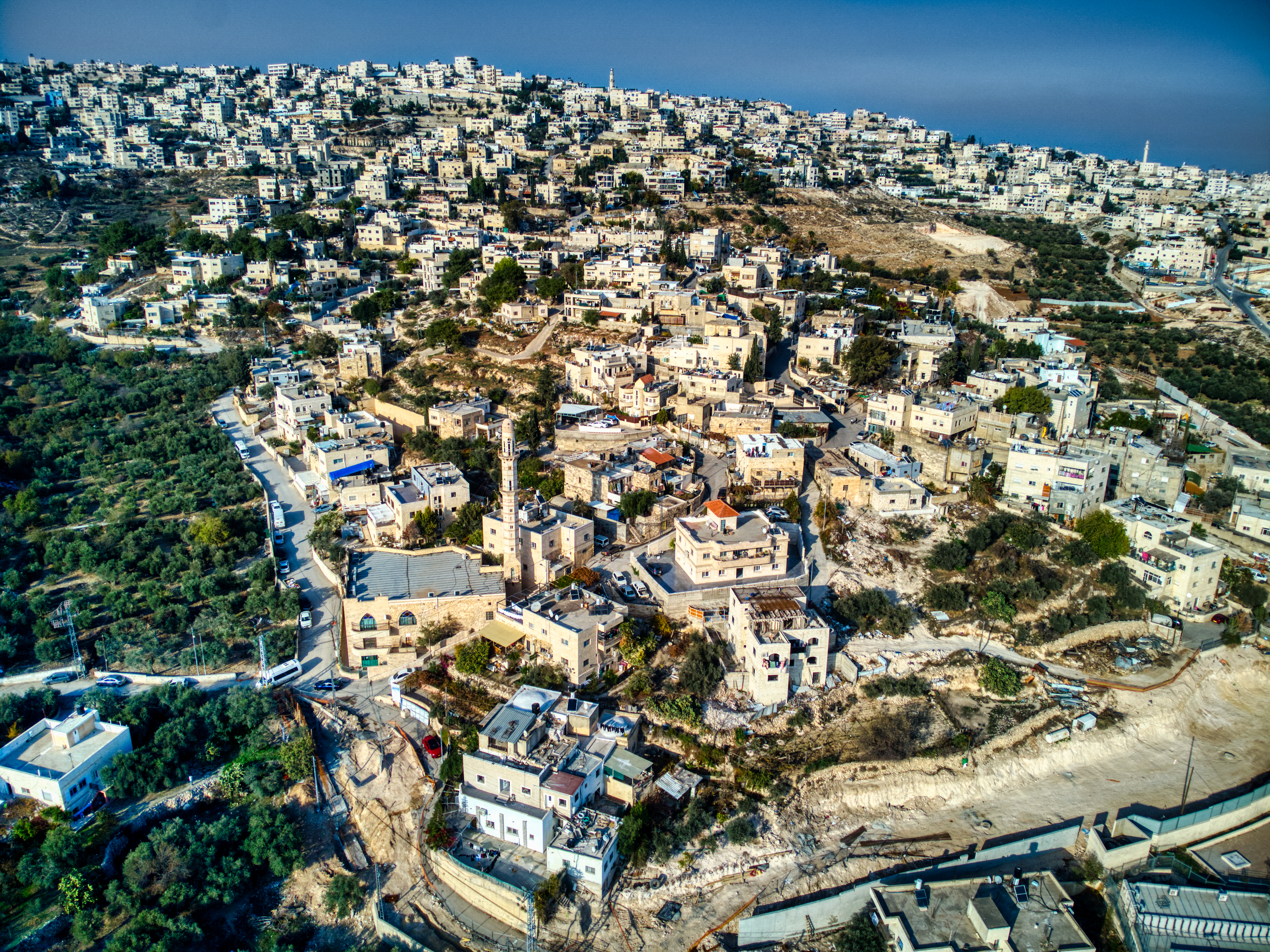
Umm Tuba

Umm Tuba neighborhood in East Jerusalem. In green : Arab areas. In blue : Jewish areas

Umm Tuba (Arabic: أم طوبا; Hebrew: אום טובא) is a Palestinian Arab neighborhood in East Jerusalem part of Sur Baher; it is northeast of Har Homa and Bethlehem, and southeast of Kibbutz Ramat Rachel. It has a population of 4,000. After the 1967 Six-Day War, Umm Tuba was incorporated into the municipal district of Jerusalem.

== Etymology ==
The name of the Arab village, "Umm Tuba," is derived from the Byzantine era name, "Metofa," itself a derivation of the name Netofa. Netofa is mentioned in the Bible as the place from which two of King David's heroes originated (2Samuel 23:28–29).

== History ==
=== Iron Age ===
Based on archaeological finds, Umm Tuba was the site of the biblical city of Netophah.

Netophah was a prosperous Judean farming village during the First Temple period. An archaeological excavation uncovered at least three royal seal impressions dating from the reign of Hezekiah, King of Judah (eighth century BCE). At least two "LMLK" (belonging to the King) impressions and two personal seal impressions were discovered on handles of large jars of the type used to store wine and olive oil.

=== Classical antiquity ===
Artifacts dating to the Hasmonean period were found at the neighborhood.

Also discovered on the outskirts of the village is a Jewish burial cave from the Second Temple Period. It follows the kokhim style characteristic of that era. Some of the kokhim openings feature incised Hebrew letters on each side, adorned with a rare and expensive blue pigment. One of these inscriptions bears the word "qtn", a personal name already documented in onomastic evidence from the Second Temple Period.

=== Byzantine Empire ===
Impressive remains of a Byzantine-era monastery have been found, which has been taken as proof that Umm Tuba was the site of “Metofa”, a place mentioned in the writings of Church elders in the Byzantine period.

Bell-shaped cisterns dug into rock have been discovered. Several tombs carved into rock, one with stone entrance has also been found, together with Byzantine ceramics.

=== Ottoman Empire ===
In 1596, Umm Tuba appeared in Ottoman tax registers as being in the Nahiya of Quds of the Liwa of Quds. It had a population of 36 Muslim households. They paid a fixed tax-rate of 33,3 % on agricultural products, including wheat, barley, olives, vines or fruit trees, and goats or beehives; a total of 7,500 Akçe. All of the revenue went to a Waqf.

French explorer Victor Guérin visited the place in 1863, and described caves and other possible remains from a Christian period. In 1883, the PEF's Survey of Western Palestine (SWP) described the village as "an ancient site with bell-mouthed cisterns and ruins of modern buildings. To the east is a Mukam of Neby Toda."

=== British Mandate ===
In the 1922 census of Palestine conducted by the British Mandate authorities, Umm Tuba was counted with Sur Baher, which had a population of 993, all Muslims, increasing in the 1931 census to 1529, still all Muslim, in 308 inhabited houses.

In the 1945 statistics the population of Umm Tuba, together with Sur Baher, was 2,450, all Muslims, who owned 8,915 dunams of land according to an official land and population survey. 911 dunams were plantations and irrigable land, 3,927 used for cereals, while 56 dunams were built-up (urban) land.

=== Jordan ===
In the wake of the 1948 Arab–Israeli War, and after the 1949 Armistice Agreements, Umm Tuba came under Jordanian rule.

Many refugees came to Umm Tuba after the 1948 Arab–Israeli War.

The Jordanian census of 1961 found 543 inhabitants.

=== Israel ===
==== 20th century ====
After the Six-Day War in 1967, Umm Tuba has been under Israeli occupation.

After the 1995 accords 40% of Sur Baher/Umm Tuba land is defined as being in Area A, 3% in Area B, while the remaining 57% is in Area C. In 1997, Israel confiscated 354 dunams of land from Umm Tuba for the Israeli settlements of Har Homa.

==== 21st century ====
In 2005, a minefield on the outskirts of Sur Baher was cleared of hundreds of Jordanian mines by Israel to ready the site for the construction of a new high school, which serves both Sur Baher and Umm Tuba. The Wingate Charitable Trust has established a joint Jewish-Arab project in which fifth and sixth graders from Umm Tuba and Kiryat HaYovel study science together. At each meeting the children learn about a scientific concept, while becoming acquainted with each other's language and culture. Through the Abraham Project at the Bible Lands Museum in Givat Ram, fourth graders from Umm Tuba meet with their Jewish peers to learn about their common ancestor, Abraham/Ibrahim. In 2012, Umm Tuba Elementary School took part in an environmental water conservation project financed by the Jerusalem Foundation.

In 2008, Prof. Tamar Rapoport and Afnan Masarwah of the Hebrew University of Jerusalem presented their research on changing perspectives of motherhood, children and family relationships among women in Umm Tuba.

== Notable people ==
- Muhammad Abu Tir

== Bibliography ==
- Barron, J.B., ed. (1923). Palestine: Report and General Abstracts of the Census of 1922. Government of Palestine.
- Conder, C.R.; Kitchener, H.H. (1883). The Survey of Western Palestine: Memoirs of the Topography, Orography, Hydrography, and Archaeology. Vol. 3. London: Committee of the Palestine Exploration Fund.
- Dauphin, C. (1998). La Palestine byzantine, Peuplement et Populations. BAR International Series 726 (in French). Vol. III : Catalogue. Oxford: Archeopress. ISBN 0-860549-05-4.
- Government of Jordan, Department of Statistics (1964). First Census of Population and Housing. Volume I: Final Tables; General Characteristics of the Population (PDF).
- Government of Palestine, Department of Statistics (1945). Village Statistics, April, 1945.
- Guérin, V. (1869). Description Géographique Historique et Archéologique de la Palestine (in French). Vol. 1: Judee, pt. 3. Paris: L'Imprimerie Nationale.
- Hadawi, S. (1970). Village Statistics of 1945: A Classification of Land and Area ownership in Palestine. Palestine Liberation Organization Research Center.
- Hütteroth, W.-D.; Abdulfattah, K. (1977). Historical Geography of Palestine, Transjordan and Southern Syria in the Late 16th Century. Erlanger Geographische Arbeiten, Sonderband 5. Erlangen, Germany: Vorstand der Fränkischen Geographischen Gesellschaft. ISBN 3-920405-41-2.
- Kagan, Evgeni D.; Eirikh-Rose, Anna (2012-03-26), Jerusalem, Umm Tuba Final Report, Hadashot Arkheologiyot – Excavations and Surveys in Israel
- Mills, E., ed. (1932). Census of Palestine 1931. Population of Villages, Towns and Administrative Areas. Jerusalem: Government of Palestine.
- Palmer, E.H. (1881). The Survey of Western Palestine: Arabic and English Name Lists Collected During the Survey by Lieutenants Conder and Kitchener, R. E. Transliterated and Explained by E.H. Palmer. Committee of the Palestine Exploration Fund.
