= Jerusalem Road 21 =

Road in Israel

Coordinates: 31°49′10″N 35°13′19″E

Jerusalem Road 21 כביש 21 ירושלים
- Atarot Convoy Road דרך שיירת עטרות
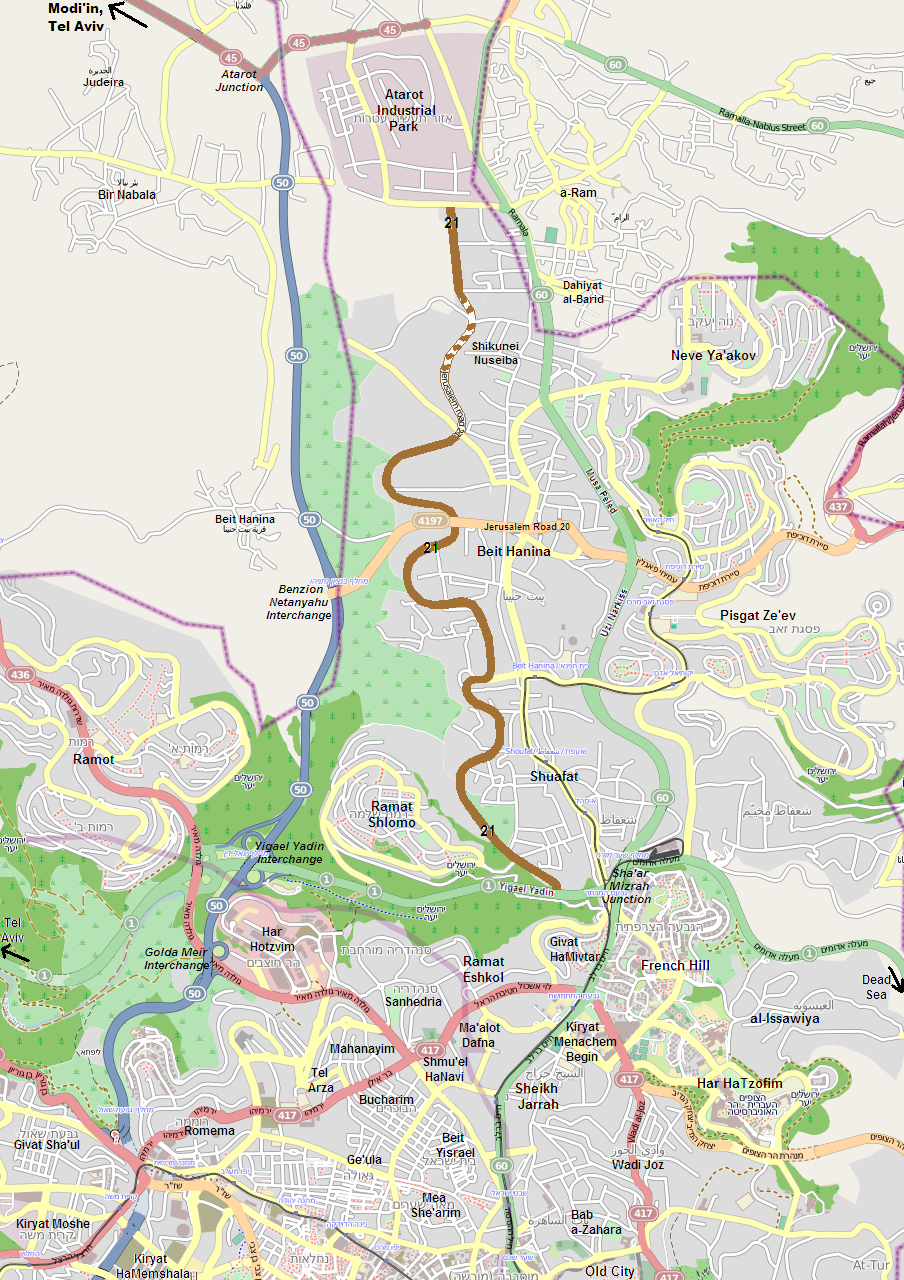
- Length: 7.35 km (4.57 mi)
- South end: Highway 1 (Yigael Yadin Blvd)
- North end: Beit Horon Road, Atarot

Construction
- Completion: 2014

Jerusalem Road 21 is a road beginning at Highway 1 between Ramat Shlomo and Shu'afat northward to Beit Hanina and the Atarot Industrial Park. The highway has lanes in each direction. The various sections of the road completed in 2014, 2017 and 2020.

== Route ==
The route begins at a new junction on Highway 1 (Yigael Yadin Boulevard) 700 metres (2,300 ft) west of the Sha'ar Mizrah Junction with Highway 60. Traveling northward, the road includes new entrances to Ramat Shlomo and Shu'afat reaching an altitude of 810 m.

It continues along the western slopes of Shu'afat and Beit Hanina above the valley of the Atarot Stream at an average altitudof 750 m. as far as Jerusalem Road 20. From there the road will proceed northward through north-west Beit Hanina, finally ending at the Atarot Industrial Park.

Rather than through cutting and bridging to cross the many draws along the hillside, the road's alignment follows a curving route while maintaining a relatively stable grade with minimal engineering.

== History ==
Plans for the road were advanced in 2002 when Moriah Jerusalem Development Corporation approved designs and published tenders for its construction. In 2005, the Israel Ministry af Transport approved financing for more detailed designs and initial clearing and fencing along the route. In 2010, the Jerusalem Municipality announced its intention to purchase land for that purpose.

When the road was first proposed, the stated official purpose was to provide an alternative to part of the existing north–south route in the area. Specifically, Shuafat Road suffers traffic congestion during rush hours as a result of the Jerusalem Light Rail which runs along its median. This will be alleviated by several access points to the new road from the west side of Shuafat and Beit Hanina.

Palestinian groups point to an additional phrase in the stated purpose which says the new road would provide additional access to Ramat Shlomo and future neighborhoods (such as Nof Shmu'el) which are considered illegal settlements by the international community.

Construction began in early 2013 beginning at the southern end at Highway 1 (Yigael Yadin Boulevard). During the initial stages of clearing, Moriah Corporation unearthed a previously unknown stone quarry and stonecutters tools dating from over 2000 years ago. According to Irene Zilberbod, excavation director on behalf of the Israel Antiquities Authority, the size and type of cuttings indicated that this particular quarry probably supplied stones for magnificent public buildings.

The first section from Highway 1 to the first traffic circle opened September, 2014. The second section to the second traffic circle opened November, 2014. The third section was completed over several more years, first to Helet Sinad and Yekutiel Adam Blvd. and then to Shomaan Street (Road 20). This third section was completed in June, 2020. The fourth section is in various stages of construction as of 2021.

== Junctions (south to north) ==
km	Name	Type	Location	Road(s) Crossed	Notes
Section 1
0			Shu'afat, Ramat Shlomo	Highway 1 (Yigael Yadin Boulevard)	(to and from westbound Highway 1 only)
0.35			Shu'afat, Ramat Shlomo	al-Masharif Street (al-Maslah Street), Hazon Ish Street	
Section 2
0.85			Shu'afat	al-Janid Street (Bir al Sabil Street)	(northbound only)
1.55			Shu'afat, Ramat Shlomo	al-Daher Street (west) to HaRav Almoshnino Street	
Section 3
1.6			Shu'afat	al-Daher Street (east)	(northbound only)
1.82			Shu'afat	al-Ras Street	(southbound only)
1.85			Shuafat	al-Hajjaj ibn Yusuf St (al-Sahel Street)	
2			Shuafat	al Qaqa' St	(southbound only)
2.4			Shuafat	Helet Sinad Street	(no left turns)
2.55			Shuafat	extension to Yekutiel Adam Blvd. to Highway 60	
2.7			Beit Hanina		
2.92			Beit Hanina	Wadi Um al-Ameed Street	
3.1			Beit Hanina	al-Huda Street	
3.25			Beit Hanina	al-Khikma Street	(northbound only)
3.3			Beit Hanina	al-Najama Street	
3.45			Beit Hanina	Ramadan Street	
3.7			Beit Hanina		
3.95			Beit Hanina	al-Damir Street	
4.15			Beit Hanina	al-Khin Street	(southbound only)
4.25			Beit Hanina	Jerusalem Road 20 (Abdul Hamid Shomaan Street)	
Section 4 - Under Construction
4.35			Beit Hanina		
4.4			Beit Hanina	Shopping center entrance	
4.5			Beit Hanina		
5			Beit Hanina		
4.6			Beit Hanina		
4.8			Beit Hanina	Khalil al-Sakakini Road	
4.6			Beit Hanina		
4.7			Beit Hanina		
4.76			Beit Hanina	al-Bironi Street	
5.5			Beit Hanina		
5.83			Beit Hanina		
6			Beit Hanina	al-Zeituna Street (Bir Nabala Road)	
6.5			Beit Hanina	Eliya Abu-Madi Street	
6.6			Beit Hanina	Alexander al-Khouri Street	
6.8			Beit Hanina	Khalil Jubran Street	
7			Beit Hanina	al-Raduwan Street al-Hadibiya Street	
7.3			Beit Hanina	al-Banias Street	
7.5			Atarot; Industrial Park	Beit Horon Road	
