= Jerusalem Road 20 =

Road in Israel

Coordinates: 31°49′46″N 35°13′34″E

Jerusalem Road 20 כביש 20 ירושלים
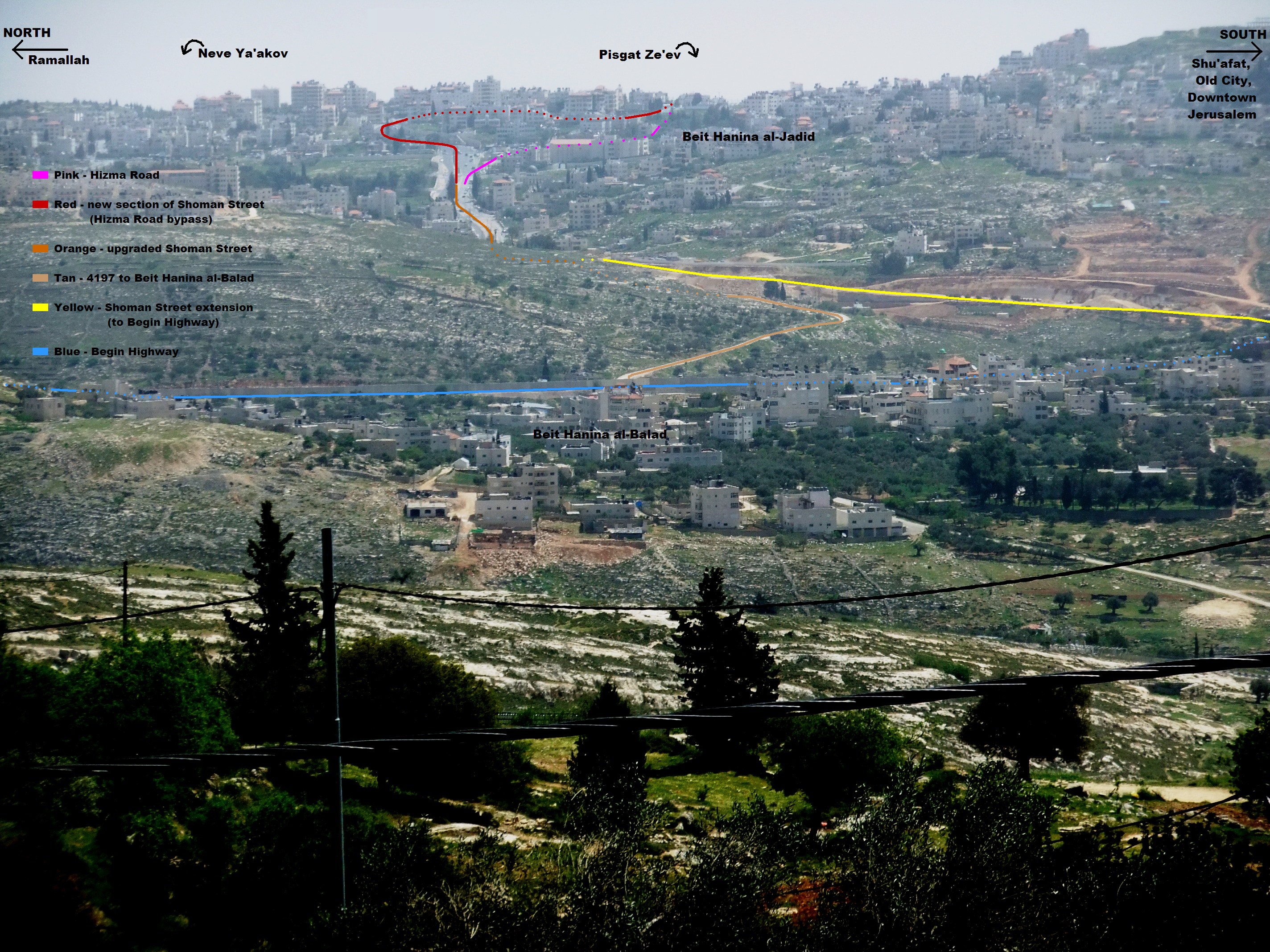

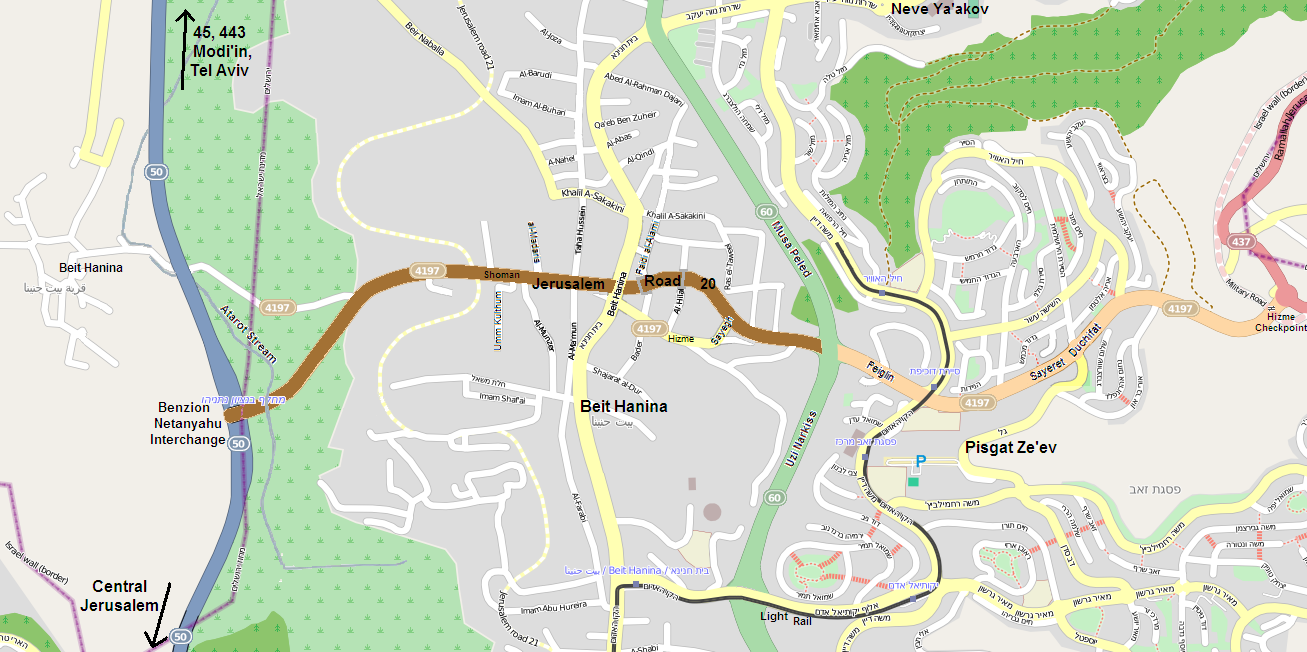
- Length: 2.5 km (1.6 mi)
- west end: 50/20 Interchange
- Major junctions: Beit Hanina Road
- east end: Junction at Highway 60

Construction
- Completion: 2013

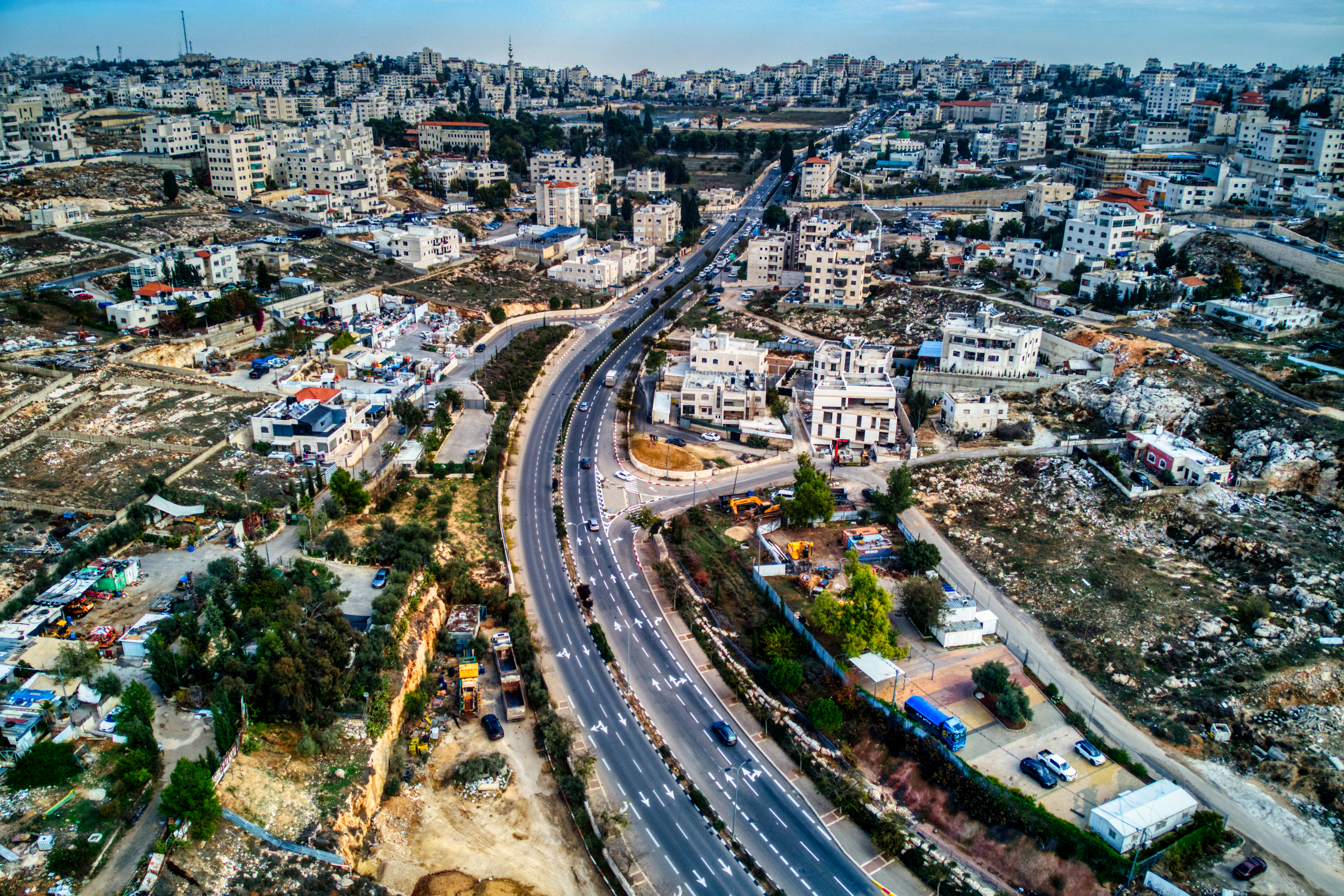
The boulevard in the center is Abdel Hamid Shoman Street, part of Jerusalem Road 20. Around it parts of Beit Hanina

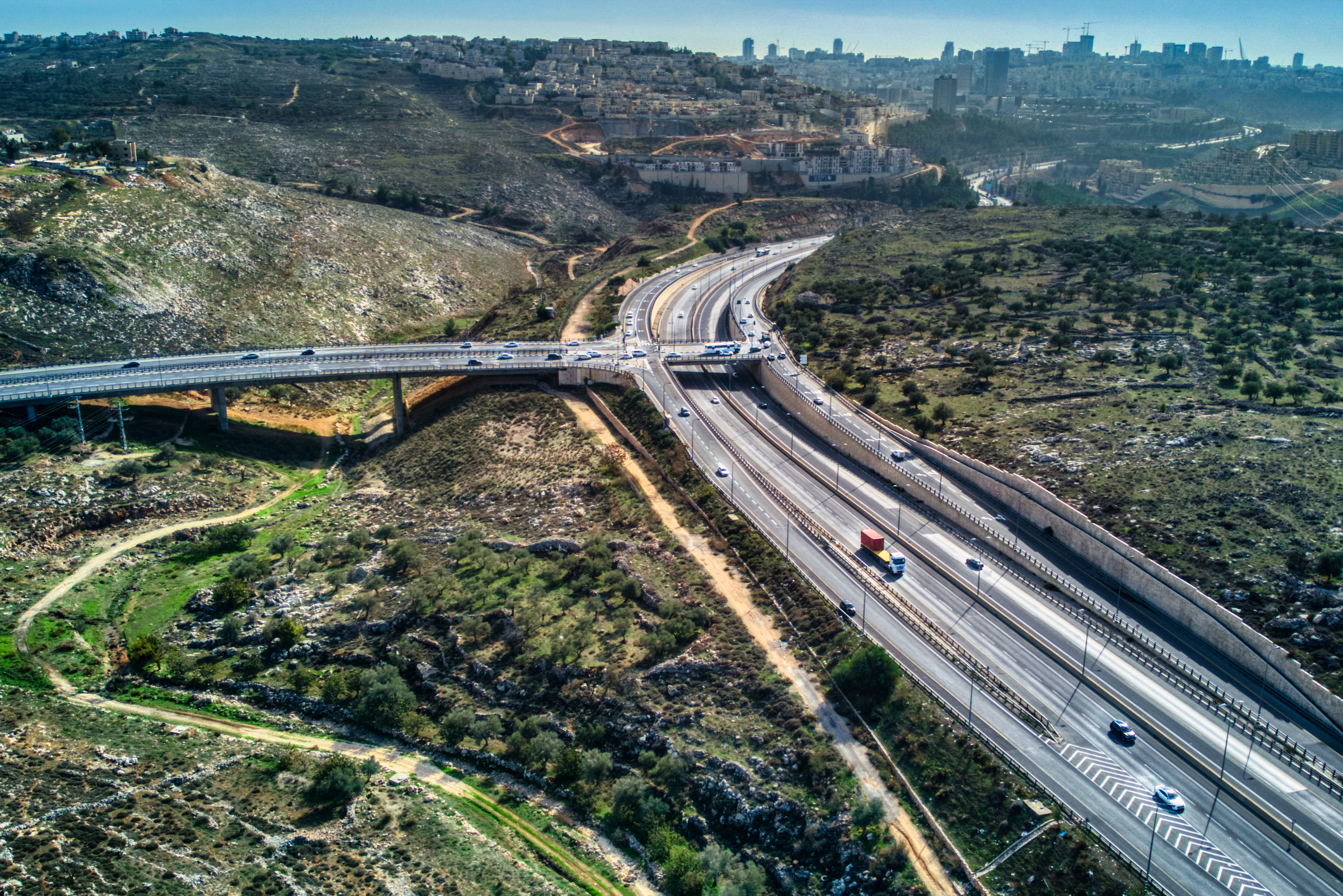
Benzion Netanyahu Interchange

Jerusalem Road 20 is a combination of existing roads and new construction creating a continuous route between Jerusalem's Highway 50 (Begin Boulevard) and Pisgat Ze'ev via Beit Hanina. The number "20" is a designation used by the Jerusalem Municipality. Several segments of the road follow national road 4197. The cost of the project was NIS 180 million and was completed on 5 May 2013.

== Route ==
The route begins at Highway 50 (Begin Boulevard) at the new Benzion Netanyahu Interchange just west of the Beit Hanina neighborhood of Jerusalem. From there the route traverses a bridge over the Atarot Stream. East of the bridge, the route connects to the existing Abdul Hamid Shoman Street (Road 4197) 0.5 km before the intersection with the north–south Jerusalem Road 21. Originally a 2-lane road, Shoman Street has been upgraded as a 4 lane divided boulevard including new sidewalks and infrastructure.

At the intersection with Taha Hussein and Al-Ma'mun Streets, where Shoman Street originally veered east-southeast to become Hizma Road, new lanes were constructed to create the Hizma Bypass curving 200 meters to the north. This new section of Shoman Street has three traffic-light controlled intersections, at Hussein and Ma'mun Streets, at Beit Hanina Road and at Maximos Sayegh Street. Two other cross streets, Faidi al-Alami Street and al-Hilal Street, were split with pedestrian bridges to provide access across the boulevard. 200 meters east of Maximos Sayegh Street, Shoman Street rejoins the original Hizma Road (Road 4197).

Another 200 meters east, Jerusalem Road 20 ends at Highway 60 (Uzi Narkis Road). From that point, the road continues as Amihai "Gidi" Paglin Street and Sayeret Duchifat Boulevard as it enters Pisgat Zeev, leading to the Hizma security checkpoint to Route 437 and the Mateh Binyamin Region.

== History ==
In the late 1990s, the Israel Ministry of Transport planned to construct Highway 45 from Highway 1 near Ben Gurion International Airport through the West Bank passing slightly north of Beit Horon and Beit Ur al-Fauqa to the Atarot Industrial Park in Jerusalem. The current Route 443, just south of these towns, has put that plan on hold, leaving a small portion of Highway 45 between Givat Zeev and Atarot completed in 2003. Furthermore, an easterly extension was envisioned which would continue from Atarot and connect with Route 437 and the Eastern Ring Road. Additionally, 45 was eventually supposed to reach the border with Jordan north of the Dead Sea. The construction of the Security Wall along the right of way of Highway 45 just east of Atarot made that plan unworkable. Another east–west route would be needed to reach Route 437.

Road 20 was first approved in 2005 as a replacement to the central portion of Highway 45 pending future developments. In 2010, the planning committee of Israel's West Bank Civil Administration accepted a plan to create the route using exiting roads and new construction. In 2011, the Hizma Road bypass was built. At the same time, Shoman Street was upgraded and the extension of Shoman Street to what was preliminarily called the 50/20 Interchange connecting with Begin Boulevard was begun. The extension and interchange were completed in May, 2013. The interchange was officially renamed after Benzion Netanyahu, the Israeli historian.

Construction of Road 20 was not without controversy. The stated official purpose of the road is to ease traffic congestion at Sha'ar Mizrach Junction of Highway 60 and Highway 1. The road provides an alternative route for residents of Beit Hanina, Shu'afat, Pisgat Zeev and Neve Yaakov via Highway 50 (Begin Boulevard) southward to central Jerusalem and northward to Route 443 to Tel Aviv. Groups such as Peace Now have stated that the plan designates occupied territory for permanent infrastructure and that the purpose of the road is to consolidate Israeli control over (North) East Jerusalem while disregarding the needs of the residents in Beit Hanina. The planning committee rejected opposition from Beit Hanina on the grounds that direct access to Begin Boulevard would benefit them and found an engineering solution in the form of a bridge to limit the footprint on West Bank land from the extension to the interchange.

== Junctions (west to east) ==
km	Name	Type	Location	Road(s) Crossed
0	מחלף בן ציון נתניהו (Benzion Netanyahu; Interchange)		Beit Hanina	Highway 50 (Begin Boulevard)
0.1	Bridge; 4 lanes, 200 meters		above Atarot Stream	
Abdul Hamid Shoman St.
0.6			Beit Hanina	Road 4197 west to Beit Hanina al-Balad
0.8	(eastbound only)		Beit Hanina	al-Sa'adeh Street
0.9	(westbound only)		Beit Hanina, Nof Shmu'el	Sha'ar Shechem Street
0.95	(eastbound only)		Beit Hanina	
1.1			Beit Hanina	Jerusalem Road 21
1.15	(westbound only)		Beit Hanina	al-Senaabil Street
1.22	(eastbound only)		Beit Hanina	Umm Kulthum St.
1.27	(eastbound only)		Beit Hanina	al-Munzer St.
1.3	(westbound only)		Beit Hanina, Beit Hanina School	al-Madaris St.
1.45			Beit Hanina, Rahadat Wardiya High School	Taha Hussein St., Al-Ma'mun St.
New Abdul Hamid Shoman St. (Hizma Road Bypass)
1.6			Beit Hanina	Beit Hanina Road
1.7	Pedestrian Bridge		Beit Hanina	Faidi al-Alami St.
1.85	Pedestrian Bridge		Beit Hanina	al-Hilal St.
2.1			Beit Hanina	Maximos Sayegh (to/from Hizma Rd.)
2.2	(westbound only)		Beit Hanina	
2.3	(westbound only)		Beit Hanina	al-Akhilaas
Hizma Rd.
2.4	(eastbound only)		Beit Hanina	
2.5			Beit Hanina, Pisgat Zeev	Highway 60 (Derech Uzi Narkiss), Amihai "Gidi" Paglin St., Sayeret Duchifat Blvd. to Route 437
