= Moriah Jerusalem Development Corporation =

Moriah - Jerusalem Development Corporation
- מוריה - חברה לפיתוח ירושלים בע"מ
- Formation: 1986; 40 years ago
- Founder: Uzi Wechsler
- Type: GO
- Legal status: Corporation
- Purpose: Infrastructure development in Jerusalem
- Headquarters: Safra Square, Jerusalem
- Services: Infrastructure development
- CEO: Doron Noioirt
- Affiliations: Municipality of Jerusalem; Ministry of Transport and Road Safety; Jerusalem Development Authority
- Budget: ₪ 5 billion
- Website: moriah.co.il

Moriah Jerusalem Development Corporation (Hebrew: מוריה - חברה לפיתוח ירושלים בע"מ) is an organization, established by the Municipality of Jerusalem in 1987. The main objective of Moriah is to develop the infrastructure in Jerusalem and perform public work for local government.

== History and management ==
Moriah was founded in 1986 by Uzi Wechsler, former city treasurer of the Jerusalem Development Authority. It has worked closely with the Jerusalem Development Authority since the time of Teddy Kollek, who was mayor of Jerusalem and founder of the Jerusalem Foundation. Moriah promotes infrastructure development for the Jerusalem Development Authority, the Ministry of Transport and Road Safety, and the Ministry of Transport and Road Safety, and it has affiliated with these ministries. It includes around 10 companies to manage and execute the projects.

== Projects ==
The company has completed more than 50 projects and it manages over 100 projects. Their notable projects and infrastructure contributions are as follows:

- Jerusalem Light Rail
- Bridge of Strings
- Jerusalem Arena
- Teddy Stadium
- Jerusalem Biblical Zoo,
- High-speed railway to Jerusalem
- Jerusalem Road 21
- Highway 1
- Highway 50
- Jerusalem Road 16
- Jerusalem Road 20
- Exploiting Solar Energy - Installing solar energy on school rooftops and public buildings in order to have utilize clean & renewable energy. So far, 90 installations have been completed through several phrases. The project will be expanded in future, especially in 2014.
