= Daniel Rothschild =

Daniel Rothschild may refer to:

- Daniel Rothschild (philosopher) (born 1979), American philosopher
- Daniel Rothschild (general) (born 1946), Israeli major general
- Daniel Rothschild (merchant), father of Samuel Rothschild
