= Sultan Ibrahim Ibn Adham Mosque =

Mosque in Beit Hanina, Palestine

- مسجد السلطان إبراهيم بن أدهم
- Location of the mosque in Jerusalem

Religion
- Affiliation: Islam
- Ecclesiastical or organizational status: Mosque
- Status: Active

Location
- Location: Beit Hanina, East Jerusalem, West Bank
- Country: Palestine
- Interactive map of Sultan Ibrahim Ibn Adham Mosque
- Coordinates: 31°49′44.31″N 35°13′31.63″E

Architecture
- Completed: 336 AH (947/948 CE)

The Sultan Ibrahim Ibn Adham Mosque (Arabic: مسجد السلطان إبراهيم بن أدهم) is the largest mosque in the Palestinian old town of Beit Hanina, located northeast of Jerusalem, in the West Bank, in the State of Palestine.

The mosque is named after a Muslim man who lived in the town and worked as collector of olive products. An engraving in a stone in front of the mosque reads, "this mosque was built by Suwaid Abul Hamayel in the year 336 after Hijrah". The area of the mosque was expanded in 1938 by the residents of Beit Hanina. In 1993, a primary school for boys was built alongside the mosque.

Sultan Ibrahim Ibn Adham was a famous saint "who renounced a Kingdom and consecrated himself to God" and buried in Jabala Syria.

There are at least 2 other mosques with this name; one in Jabala, Syria, and the other in Byblos, Lebanon.
