= Coordinator of Government Activities in the Territories =

Unit in the Israeli Ministry of Defense

- Hebrew: מתאם פעולות הממשלה בשטחים
- Formation: 1967
- Headquarters: HaKirya, Tel Aviv
- Region served: West Bank and Gaza Strip
- Coordinator: Ghassan Alian
- Subsidiaries: Israeli Civil Administration; Coordination and Liaison Administration of the Gaza Strip
- Website: Official website

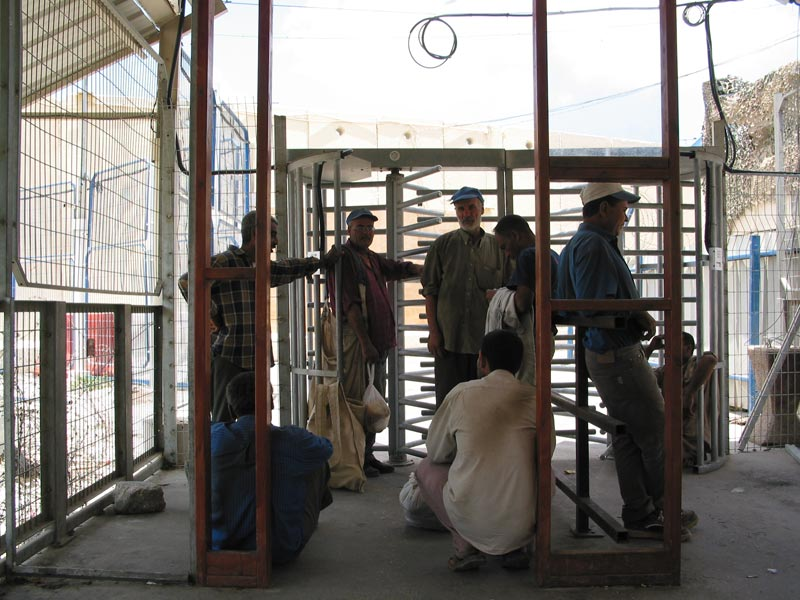
Palestinian workers wait at the Erez Crossing to enter the Gaza Strip, July 2005

The Coordinator of Government Activities in the Territories (COGAT; Hebrew: מתאם פעולות הממשלה בשטחים) is a unit in the Israeli Ministry of Defense tasked with overseeing civilian policy in the West Bank, as well as facilitating logistical coordination between Israel and the Gaza Strip. It operates in collaboration with Israeli governmental and defense officials. COGAT operates under the authority of Israel's Minister of Defense and is led by a major general who is part of the general staff of the IDF.

COGAT's objective is to advance and execute the policies of the Israeli government concerning civilian affairs, including the facilitation of humanitarian issues, the promotion of humanitarian projects, and the facilitation of infrastructure and financial initiatives. It collaborates with the international community, encompassing governmental and non-governmental organizations, to contribute to the development and enhancement of the living standards of Palestinians residing in the areas it prioritizes.

COGAT's headquarters are in the Kirya compound in Tel Aviv. The unit headed by the Coordinator of Government Activities in the Territories, Major-General Yoram Halevi.

== Gaza Strip ==
=== Civilian coordination ===
COGAT is responsible for managing the civilian fabric of life and facilitating essential services for the population in the West Bank and, to a more limited extent, the Gaza Strip. Its responsibilities include issuing work and trade permits, supporting economic and industrial activities, and ensuring the operation of key civilian infrastructure such as water, electricity, gas, cellular services, and mail. It also provides services to the Israeli population residing in the West Bank and coordinates activities with foreign entities, including diplomats, aid organizations, media outlets, and religious groups.

=== Security coordination ===
COGAT oversees mechanisms for security-related coordination with the Palestinian security system to preserve strategic stability in the area. Following the establishment of the Palestinian Authority in 1994, direct Israeli control over the Palestinian population in the Gaza Strip ceased, and the Israeli Civil Administration there was dissolved, limiting direct operational responsibility primarily to Areas B and C of the West Bank.

== Heads of COGAT ==
| Date | Head | Palestinian counterpart |
|---|---|---|
| Aug 1967 - Apr 1974 | Shlomo Gazit | None |
| Apr 1974 - Feb 1976 | Rafael Vardi | None |
| Feb 1976 - Feb 1979 | Avraham Orly | None |
| Feb 1979 - Jan 1982 | Danny Matt | None |
| Jan 1982 - Aug 1983 | Rehavia Vardi | None |
| Aug 1983 - Apr 1984 | Binyamin Ben-Eliezer | None |
| Apr 1984 - Feb 1991 | Shmuel Goren | None |
| Feb 1991 - Feb 1995 | Daniel "Danny" Rothschild | None |
| Feb 1995 - Feb 1997 | Oren Shachor | Palestinian Authority (following the Oslo II Accord) |
| Feb 1997 - Jul 2001 | Yaakov Or | Palestinian Authority (following the Oslo II Accord) |
| Jul 2001 - Jul 2003 | Amos Gilad | Palestinian Authority (following the Oslo II Accord) |
| Jul 2003 - Sep 2008 | Yosef Mishlav | Palestinian Authority (following the Oslo II Accord) |
| Sep 2008 - 6 Dec 2009 | Amos Gilad | Palestinian Authority (following the Oslo II Accord) |
| 6 Dec 2009 – 29 Jan 2014 | Eitan Dangot | Palestinian Authority (following the Oslo II Accord) |
| 29 Jan 2014 - 1 May 2018 | Yoav "Poli" Mordechai | Palestinian Authority (following the Oslo II Accord) |
| 1 May 2018 - 7 Apr 2021 | Kamil Abu Rokon | Palestinian Authority (following the Oslo II Accord) |
| 7 Apr 2021 - 4 Feb 2026 | Ghassan Alian | Palestinian Authority (following the Oslo II Accord) |
| 4 Feb 2026 - | Yoram Halevi | Palestinian Authority (following the Oslo II Accord) |

== See also ==
- Enclave law
- Israel Border Police
- Palestinian freedom of movement
