= Ghassan Alian =

Israeli Druze officer of the IDF

- غسان عليان
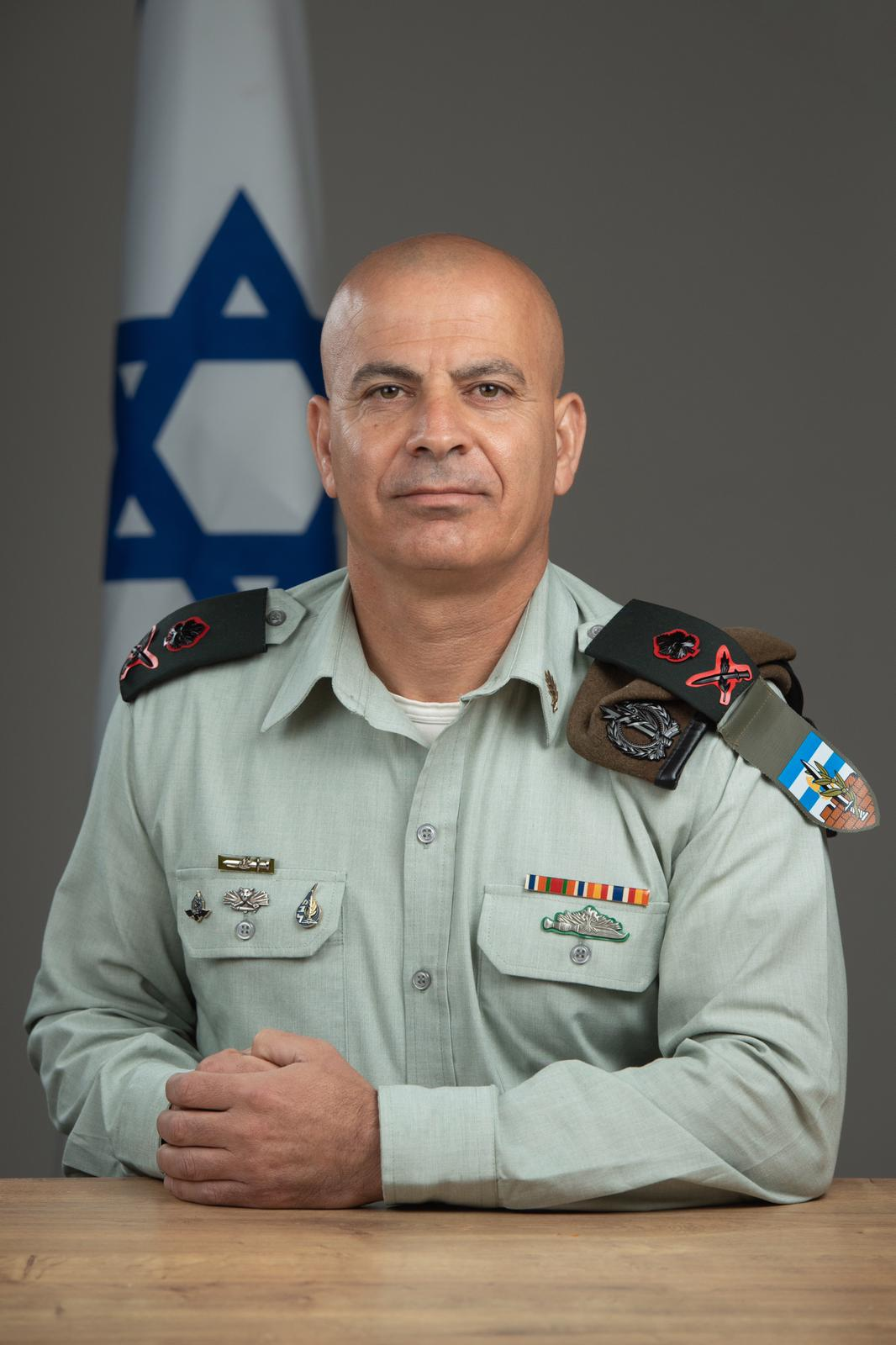
- Born: 21 March 1972 (age 54); Shefa-'Amr, Israel
- Military career
- Allegiance: Israel
- Branch: Israel Defense Forces
- Service years: 1990–
- Rank: Aluf (Major General)
- Unit: Coordinator of Government Activities in the Territories
- Conflicts: First Intifada; South Lebanon conflict (1985–2000); 2006 Lebanon War; Operation Cast Lead; Operation Pillar of Defense; Operation Protective Edge; Gaza war

Ghassan Alian (Arabic: غسان عليان, Hebrew: רסאן עליאן; born 21 March 1972) is an Israeli-Druze officer in the IDF holding the rank of Aluf (equivalent to Major General). Alian served as the head of the Coordinator of Government Activities in the Territories, Central Command's executive officer and head of the Israeli Civil Administration. Alian is one of the highest ranking Druze Arabs in the IDF and has served since 1990.

== Biography ==
Ghassan Alian is from Shefa-'Amr. He and his wife Shirin have three children.

== Military career ==
Alian was Chief Infantry and Paratroopers Officer and commanding officer of the Golani Brigade. He is the first non-Jewish commander of the brigade and the second Druze officer to command an Israel Defense Forces infantry brigade; the first was Imad Fares, commander of the Givati Brigade. Alian was previously the commander of the Duchifat Battalion, commander of the Alexandroi reserve Brigade, and commander of the Menashe Territorial Brigade near Jenin in the West Bank. He had taken officer training at the same time as Naftali Bennett, who praised Alian's selection as Golani Brigade commander by calling him "a brother". Prior to his appointment to the post of commander, Alian served as the brigade's deputy commander along with other appointments. In October 2013 Benny Gantz, the IDF's chief of staff, made the appointment.

Alian was wounded in a battle on 19 July 2014 during overnight clashes in the northern Gaza Strip as part of Operation Protective Edge. He was lightly injured in his eye, but his vision was not affected. He was evacuated to Soroka Hospital in Beersheba and while being treated he reportedly stated, "I have a lot of soldiers over there and I need to get back to them". He later returned to his soldiers after being treated.

On March 14, 2021, he was promoted to Aluf rank and on April 6 of the same year he began his role as the head of the Coordinator of Government Activities in the Territories.

In the wake of the Hamas invasion on 7 October, he was criticized for saying "Human animals must be treated as such."

== See also ==
- List of Israeli Druze
