= Duchifat Battalion =

94th Battalion, "Duchifat" (Hoopoe)
- Active: 1984–Present
- Country: Israel
- Allegiance: IDF
- Branch: Army
- Type: Infantry
- Role: Infantry, Counter-Terrorism
- Size: Battalion
- Part of: Kfir Brigade, 162nd Division
- Colors: Spotted beret, camouflage and white striped flag (Until 2006: black beret, red and white flag)
- Equipment: M16, M4, M203, Negev, MAG, M2, M113
- Engagements: First Intifada, Second Intifada, Operation Defensive Shield

Commanders
- Current commander: Lt.-Col. Raz Sarig

Duchifat Battalion (Sayeret Dukhifat) is a battalion in the Kfir Brigade of the Israel Defense Force.

== History ==
The Duchifat Battalion (94th Battalion) was established in 1984 as an anti-tank unit. After its establishment, the level of professional training rose. Basic training is carried out at the Paratroopers training base and includes antitank warfare, navigation and advanced infantry training.

The battalion specializes in urban combat. Maneuvers include counter-terror operations, apprehension of terrorists, patrols, manning checkpoints and regular security activities.

From 1984 to 2006, the soldiers wore red boots – symbolizing their affiliation with the paratroopers – and at the same time, a black beret – as part of an armoured division – with an infantry pin. The unit's flag was similar to the paratroopers' flag – red and white.

In 2008, Duchifat was selected to receive the Chief of Staff Prize for its outstanding service.

== Notable soldiers ==
- Ghassan Alian (born 1972), commander of the Golani Brigade
