= Daniel Rothschild (general) =

- דניאל רוטשילד
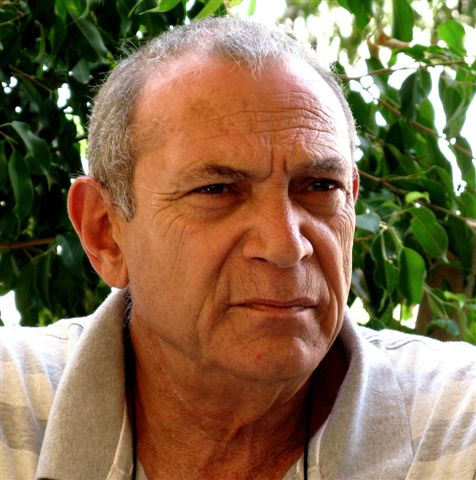
- Born: 1946 (age 79–80); Rishon LeZion, Mandatory Palestine
- Military career
- Allegiance: Israel
- Branch: Military Intelligence Directorate
- Service years: 1964–1995
- Rank: Aluf
- Commands: Coordinator of Government Activities in the Territories, deputy director of Military Intelligence Directorate and director of Research Department, commander of the IDF Units in Southern Lebanon

Major General (ret.) (Aluf) Daniel Rothschild (Hebrew: דניאל רוטשילד; born 1946) is the head of The Institute for Policy and Strategy (IPS), an Israeli Think Tank in the Lauder school of Government, Diplomacy and Strategy at the Interdisciplinary Center Herzliya (IDC) and is the chairman of the annual Herzliya Conference series.

Gen. Rothschild also heads the Council for Peace and Security, an Israeli association of national security experts, He is a member of the advisory board of the Central Bank of Israel and the chairman of the board of trustees of the Afeka College of Engineering.

During his service as Coordinator of Government Activities in the Territories, Rothschild played a significant role in the negotiations that led to Israel’s peace agreements with Jordan and with the Palestinians. He served as a member of Israel’s delegation to the peace talks with the Jordanians and with the Palestinians in Madrid and Washington, D.C., and headed Israel’s delegation in the bilateral peace talks held in Cairo. Gen. Rothschild was also a senior member of Israel’s delegation to the Paris economic talks for negotiation of the Israeli – Palestinian economic agreement.

== Military career ==
Gen. Rothschild enlisted in the Israel Defense Forces in 1964 and served in various field commands. In 1968, he was transferred to the Intelligence corps, where he served in Senior positions in the various regional commands.

In 1984, Rothschild was appointed assistant to the IDF Chief of Staff, Moshe Levi and in 1985 was promoted to the rank of brigadier general and appointed the commander of the IDF Units in Southern Lebanon.

Rothschild later served as deputy director of the Military Intelligence Directorate and director of Research Department, where he was responsible for national strategic (political and military) research and analysis, including before and during the first Gulf War.

In 1991 Rothschild was promoted to the rank of major general (Aluf) and was appointed Coordinator of Government Activities in the Territories. He served in this role until his retirement in 1995.

== Civilian career ==
Upon his retirement from the IDF in 1995, Gen. Rothschild founded the global security consultancy NETACS ltd. and assumed several public positions, such as the chairman of the Israeli Board of the America-Israel Friendship League and as a member of the board of governors of the Hebrew University of Jerusalem

As of 2009 he heads the Council for Peace and Security, is a member of the advisory board of the Central Bank of Israel, the chairman of the board of trustees of the Afeka College of Engineering and in September 2009 was appointed head of The Institute for Policy and Strategy (IPS) and the chairman of the annual Herzliya Conference series.
