= Ramat Shlomo =

Israeli settlement in East Jerusalem

Coordinates: 31°48′37.72″N 35°13′4.97″E

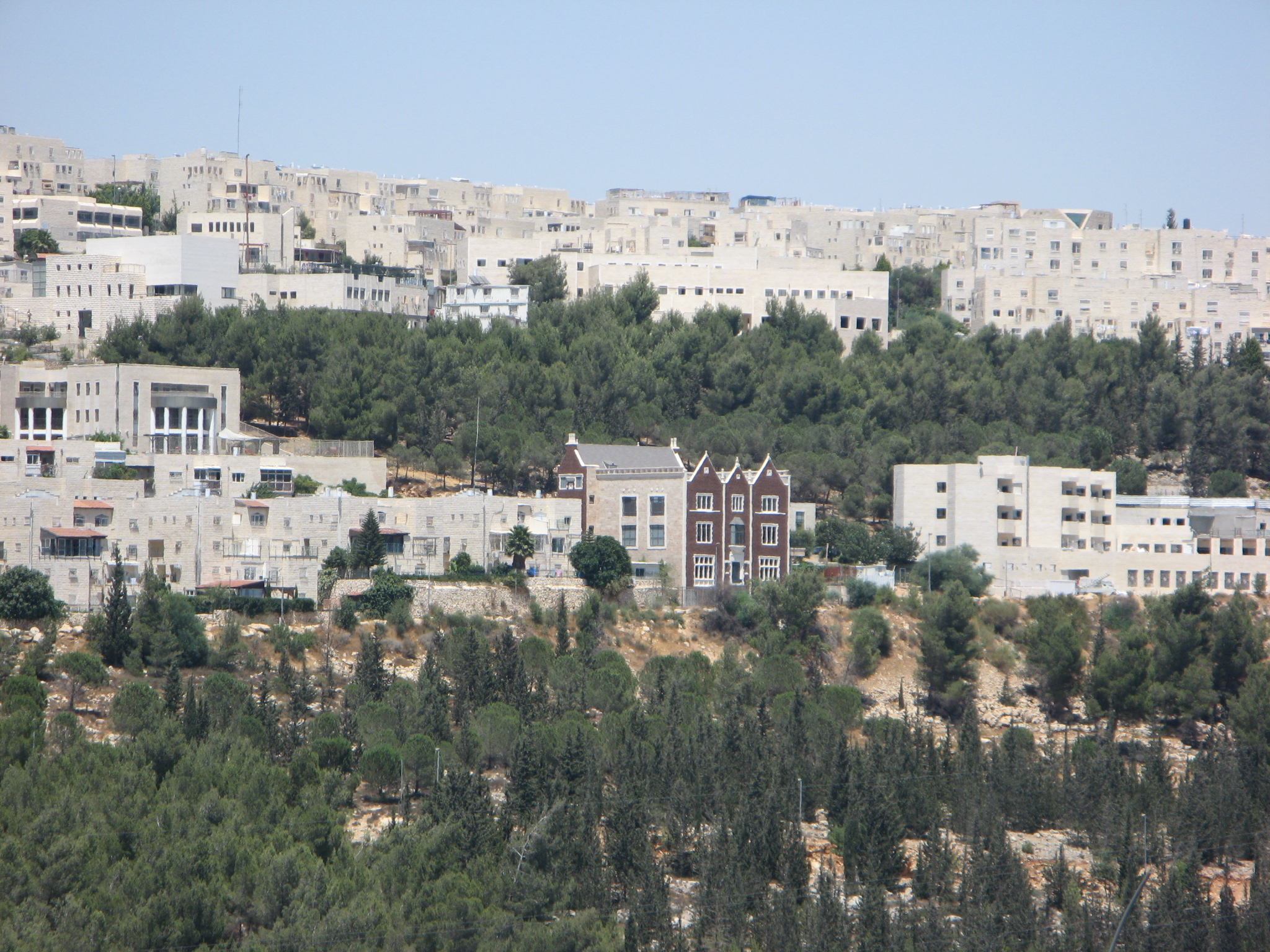
View of Ramat Shlomo

Ramat Shlomo (Hebrew: רמת שלמה, lit. Shlomo's or Solomon's Heights) is an Israeli settlement in East Jerusalem. The population, mostly ultra-Orthodox, is 21,000.

Ramat Shlomo was built on land occupied by Israel since its capture from Jordan in the 1967 Six-Day War and is considered by the international community to be an Israeli settlement. The international community considers Israeli settlements in East Jerusalem illegal under international law, but the Israeli government disputes this.

== History ==
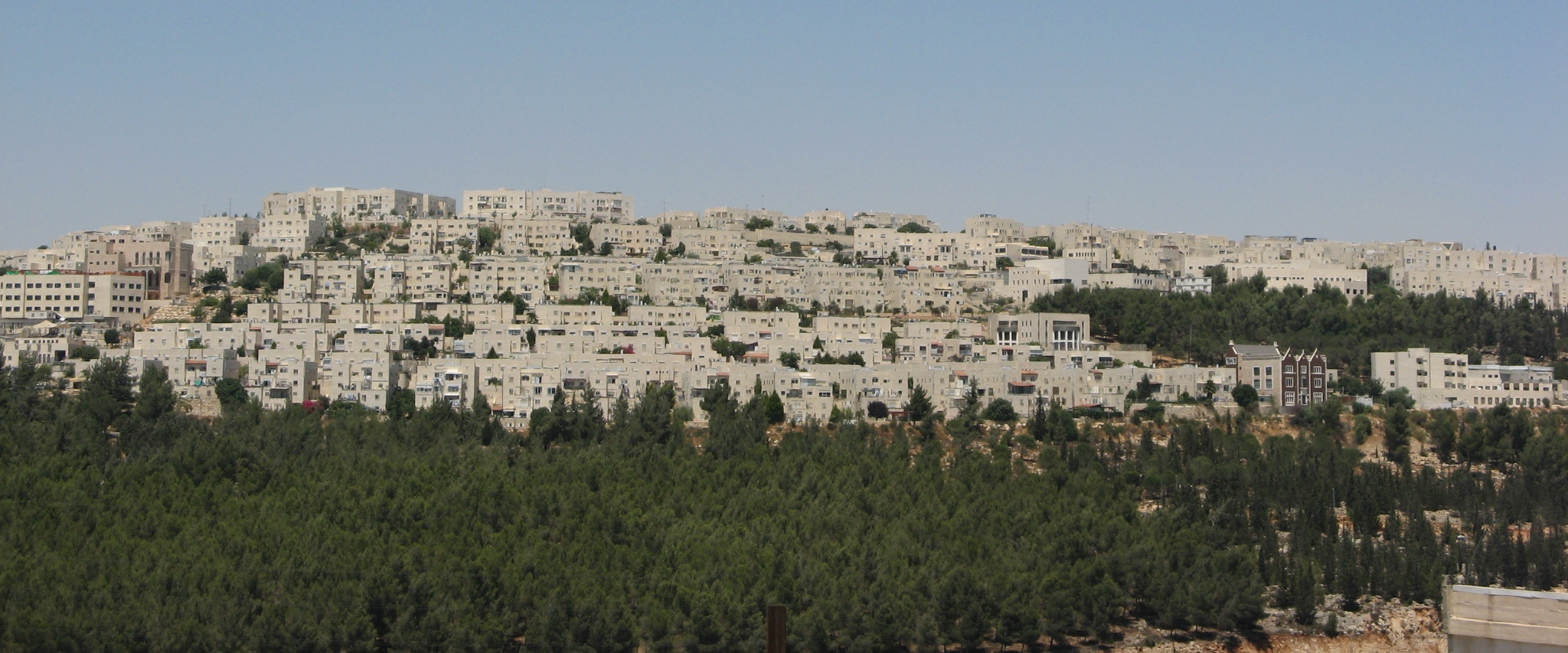
Ramat Shlomo

According to ARIJ, Israel confiscated land from the nearby Palestinian villages in order to construct Ramat Shlomo:

- 1,494 dunams from Shuafat,
- 232 dunams from Beit Hanina,
- 53 dunams from Beit Hanina el Balad (the old town)-

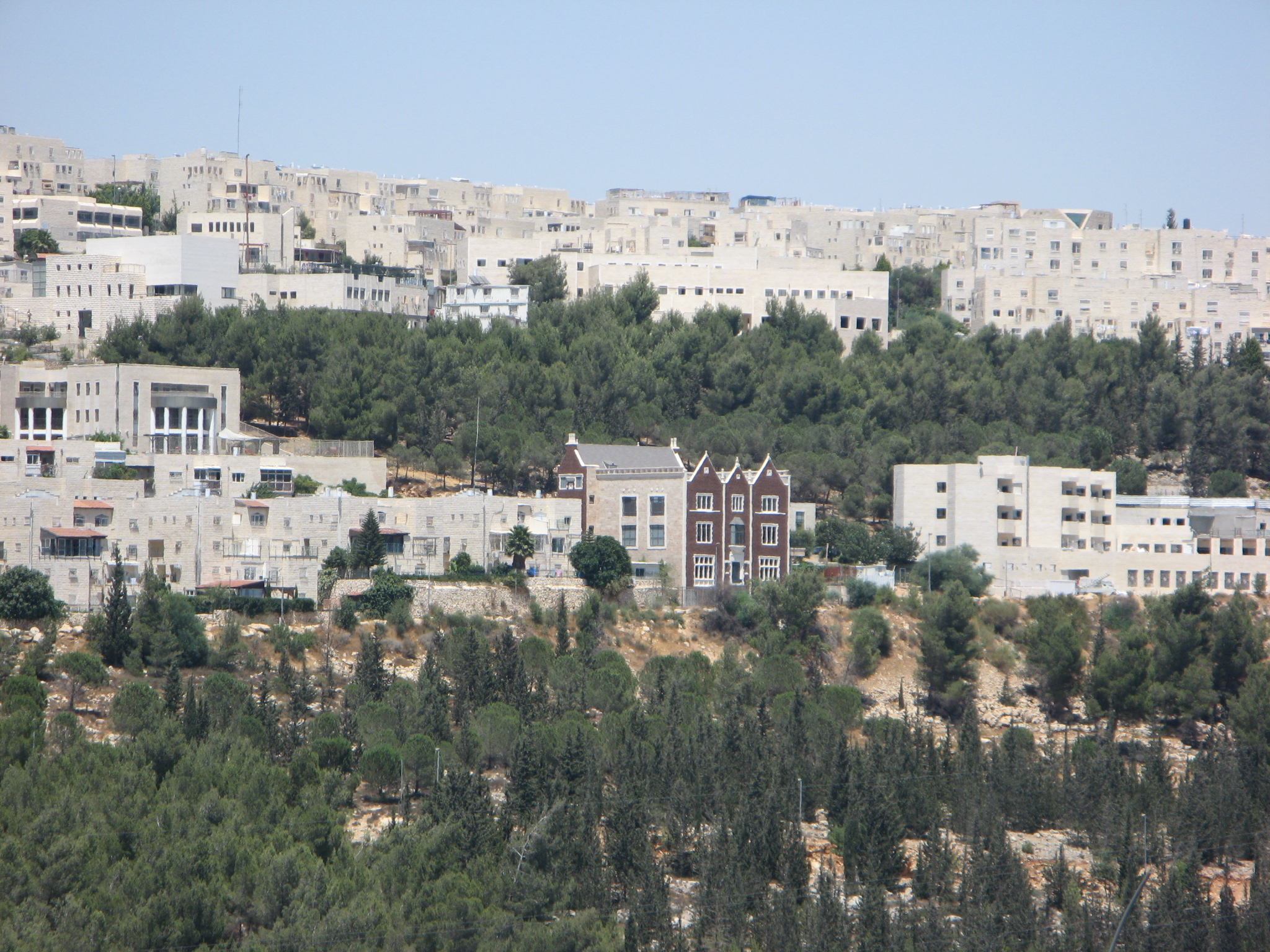
View of the neighborhood with the Chabad centre in the centre.

Ramat Shlomo was founded in 1995. It borders Ramot to the west, Har Hotzvim to the south, and Shuafat to the east. Initially called Reches Shuafat (Shuafat Ridge), it was later named for Rabbi Shlomo Zalman Auerbach.

Teddy Stadium was initially planned for Ramat Shlomo, but in the wake of Haredi protests the stadium and sports complex was moved to Jerusalem's Malha neighbourhood.

Less than 200 meters separate the neighborhood's furthermost houses from the first row of homes in Shuafat and Beit Hanina.

In June 2008, Israel's interior ministry approved construction of an additional 1,300 apartments in Ramat Shlomo. Israel says that most of the building is on land annexed by the state and thus does not violate its commitment not to build on disputed land.

In March 2010, the Jerusalem municipality approved the construction of an additional 1,600 apartments in Ramat Shlomo. The announcement coincided with the visit of U.S. Vice-president Joe Biden, angering the U.S. government and prompting the Palestinian Authority to pull out of US-brokered indirect "proximity talks" intended to revive the Israeli–Palestinian peace process. The European Union was also critical of the decision. Israeli Prime Minister Benjamin Netanyahu replied that Israel's policy on building in Jerusalem was the same policy followed by all Israeli governments over the past 42 years, and had not changed.

In October 2014, Netanyahu approved the construction of 660 additional units, followed by an additional 500 in November. In November 2015 Netanyahu gave approval to begin marketing the 1,000 properties.

== Political status ==
The neighborhood is across the Green Line on land occupied by Israel since its capture from Jordan in the 1967 Six-Day War and annexed to Israel in a move not recognized by the international community. As such it is considered an Israeli settlement in East Jerusalem by the international community. Israel disputes this and considers Ramat Shlomo to be a neighborhood within the Israeli designated borders of Jerusalem. The New York Times printed an article referring to Ramat Shlomo as a settlement in the West Bank and two days later issued a correction, stating that "[i]t is a neighborhood in East Jerusalem, not a settlement in the West Bank".

The international community considers Israeli settlements to be illegal under international law, violating the Fourth Geneva Convention's prohibition on transferring civilian population into territory held under military occupation. Israel disputes that East Jerusalem is occupied territory and rejects that settlements are illegal.

== Archaeology ==
A quarry from the period of the Second Temple was found at Ramat Shlomo. King Herod is believed to have used stones from this quarry for his massive construction project to expand the Temple Mount. Giant stones extracted from the quarry weighed several tons. Jewish tombs have also been discovered in Ramat Shlomo dating to this period.

== Landmarks ==
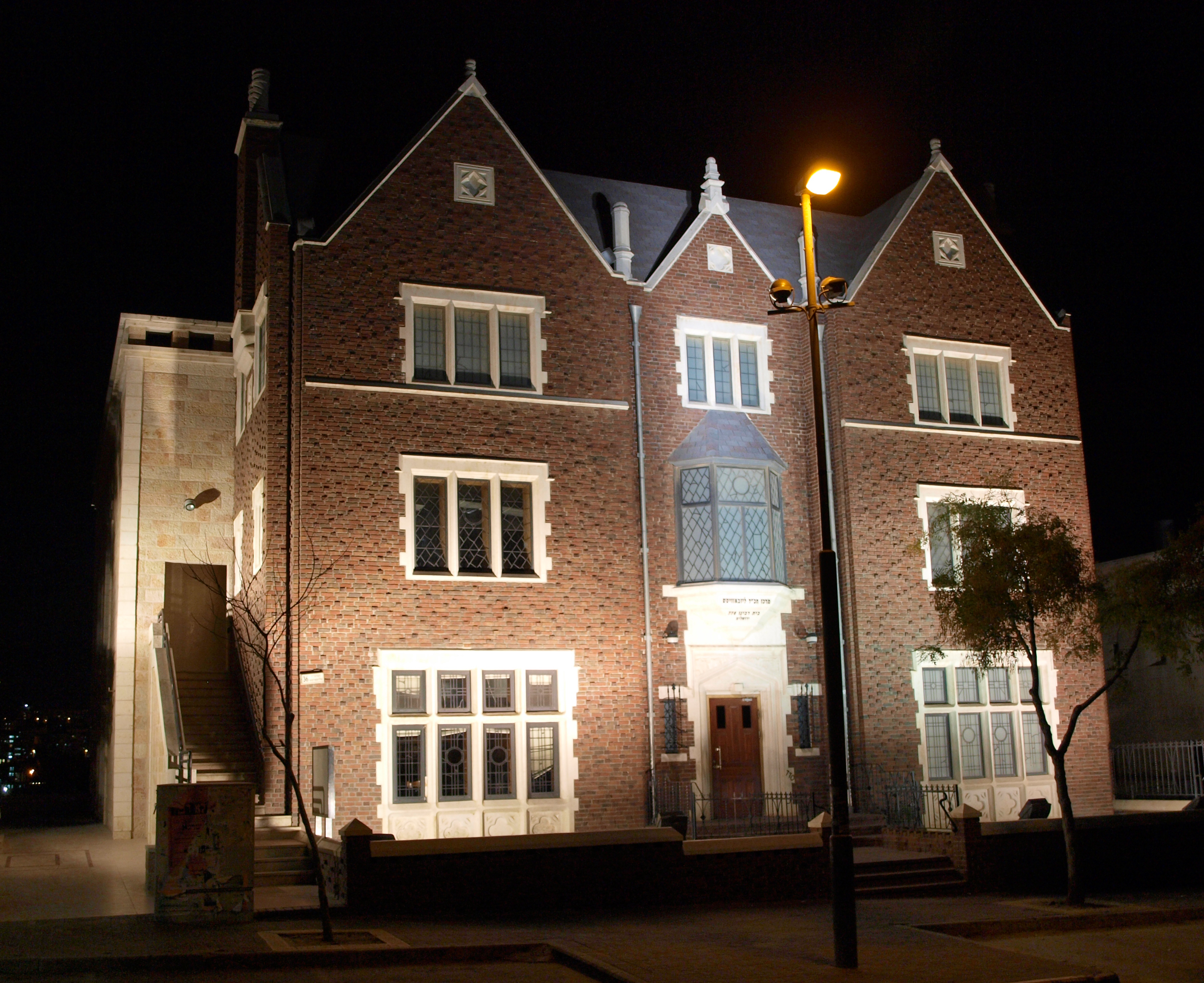
Chabad center in Ramat Shlomo

The facade of the Chabad Synagogue in Ramat Shlomo is a replica of Lubavitch World Headquarters, known simply as "770" at 770 Eastern Parkway in Brooklyn, New York.

== Notable residents ==
- Zvi Kogan (1996-2024), Israeli-Moldovan rabbi killed in the United Arab Emirates
