= Beit Hanina =

Palestinian neighborhood in East Jerusalem and the West Bank

- Neighborhood

Arabic transcription(s)
  - Arabic: بيت حنينا
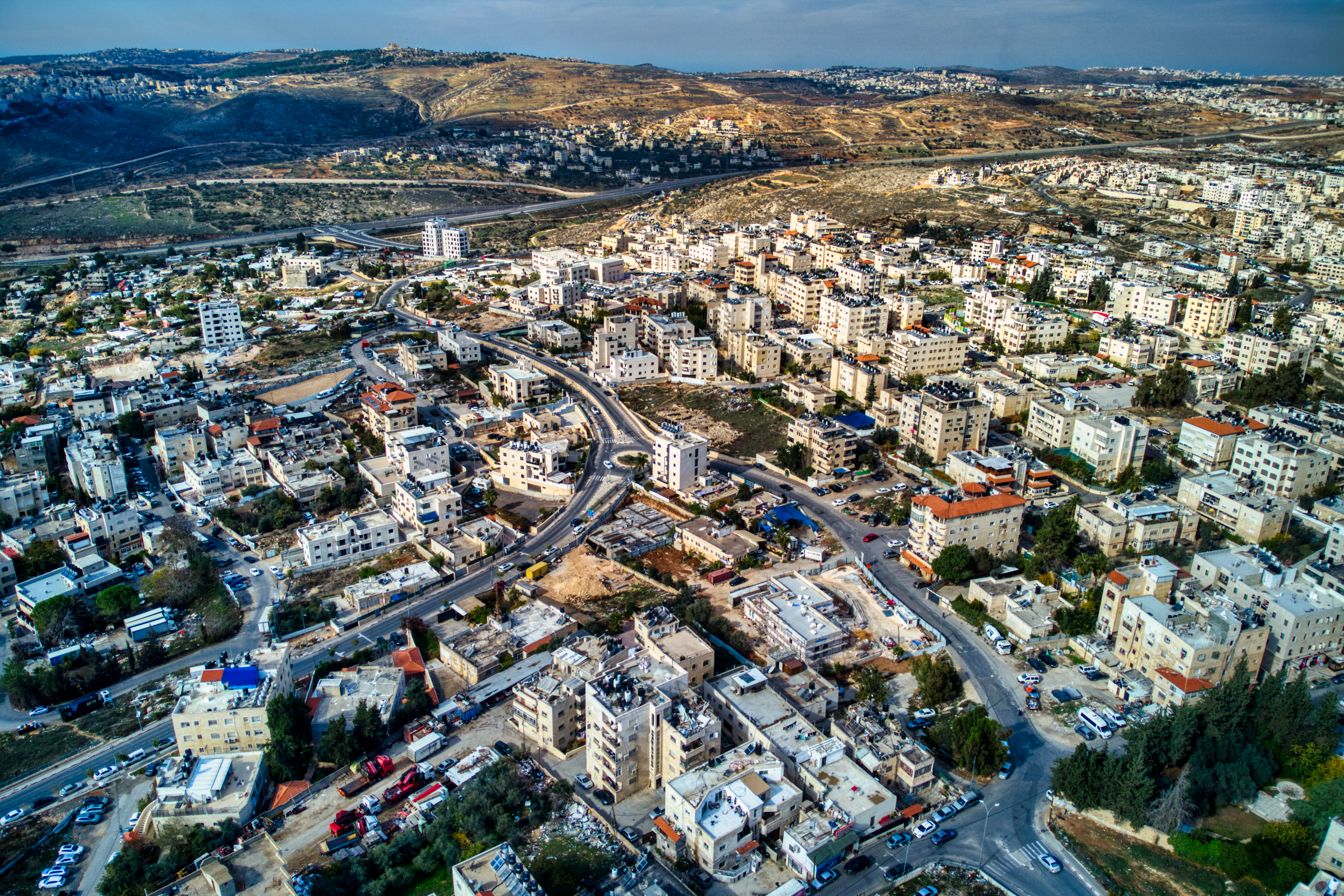
- Beit Hanina al-Jadid and behind it Beit Hanina al-Balad

- Location of Beit Hanina within Palestine
- Coordinates: 31°49′50″N 35°12′58″E
- Palestine grid: 169/137
- State: State of Palestine
- Governorate: Quds

Government
  - Type: Village council

Area
  - Total: 16.3 km^{2} (6.3 sq mi)

Population (2007)
  - Total: 1,107 (al-Balad); 26,762 (al-Jadid)
  - Density: 67.9/km^{2} (176/sq mi)
- Name meaning: "House of Hanina"

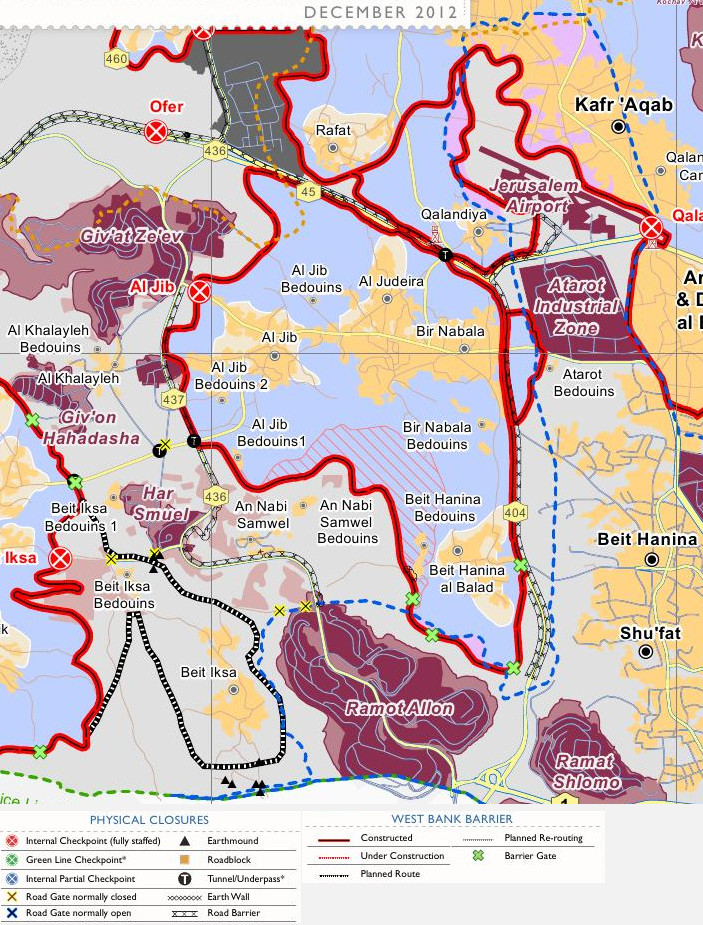
The Israeli barrier in northern Jerusalem, which divides Beit Hanina into two villages, both in a separate enclave.

Beit Hanina (Arabic: بيت حنينا) is an Arab Palestinian neighborhood in East Jerusalem. It is on the road to Ramallah, eight kilometers north of central Jerusalem, at an elevation of 780 meters above sea level. Beit Hanina is bordered by Pisgat Ze'ev and Hizma to the east, Ramot, Ramat Shlomo and Shuafat to the south, Beit Iksa and Nabi Samwil to the west, and Bir Nabala, al-Jib, Kafr Aqab and ar-Ram to the north.

Beit Hanina is divided by the Israeli West Bank barrier into Al-Jadida (the new village), which is located within the Israeli Jerusalem municipality and includes the vast majority of the built-up area, and Al-Balad (the old village), which lies outside the municipality. The total area of Beit Hanina is 16.3 sq. kilometers (6.3 sq. miles) or 16,284 dunams, of which 2,775 are built up.

In 2007, Beit Hanina had a population of over 27,000, including 26,762 Jerusalem residents in the new village and 1,107 under PNA administration.

== Etymology ==
Beit Hanina means "House of Hanina," suggesting that it is named after a person, possibly a woman. Writing in the middle of the 20th century, Palestinian educator Mustafa al-Dabbagh derived the name from the Assyrian "Han-nina", which he interpreted as meaning "the one who deserves pity" (hanan). A more modern, comparative linguistic analysis derives the name from the Aramaic personal name Ḥnyn’, meaning "the merciful".

== Archeology ==
In June 2013, Israel Antiquities Authority unearthed an 1800-year-old Roman road in Beit Hanina. The Jerusalem Post wrote about this discovery: "According to the Antiquities Authority, the 8-meter-wide road, which dates back to the Roman Empire, led from Jaffa to Jerusalem and was built with large flat stones and curbstones to create a surface that was comfortable for walking. Some of the stones were highly polished, indicating heavy pedestrian use, the authority added."

== History ==
According to the 19th-century French traveler Victor Guérin, Beit Hanina is the biblical Ananiah of the Tribe of Benjamin. Edward Robinson concurred, but W.F. Albright maintained that Ananiah is the village of al-Eizariya. Guerin also wrote that it was sometimes called Bayt Anina.

In 636, Beit Hanina was annexed by the Islamic Caliphate led by Umar Ibn al-Khattab as a result of a decisive Muslim victory over the Byzantines at the Battle of Yarmouk. In the early centuries of Islamic rule over Palestine, Yemenite and Qaisi Arabs migrated to Beit Hanina. The economy was agricultural, based primarily on olives, figs, barley and bulgur.

In 1099, Crusader armies captured Jerusalem, including Beit Hanina, inflicting heavy casualties on the Muslim population and causing most of the residents to flee. They later returned to cultivate their orchards and grain fields. The town was recaptured by the Ayyubid Dynasty led by Salah ad-Din. To ensure a Muslim majority and protect it from a renewed Crusader invasion, Salah ad-Din brought powerful Bedouin tribes from the Negev desert and the northern Hejaz to settle in the area.

The Friday Mosque in Beit Hanina, Sultan Ibrahim Ibn Adham Mosque, is dedicated to Ibrahim ibn Adham, Guérin had noted it was dedicated to "Sidi Ibrahim". In 1927 Tawfiq Canaan published the inscription above the gate of the mosque, which commemorated its building in 637/1239-1240 CE.

=== Ottoman Empire ===
The village was incorporated into the Ottoman Empire in 1517 with all of Palestine, and in 1596 Beit Hanina appeared in Ottoman tax registers as being in the Nahiya of Quds of the Liwa of Quds. It had a population of 28 Muslim households, who paid a fixed tax rate of 33.3% on various agricultural products, including wheat, barley, vineyards/fruit trees, goats and beehives, in addition to occasional revenues; a total of 10,300 akçe. All of the revenue went to a Muslim charitable endowment.

In 1838 Beit Hanina was noted as a Muslim village, located in the immediate surroundings of El-Kuds.

Guérin, who visited in 1863, estimated that the village had 300 inhabitants. Socin found from an official Ottoman village list from about 1870 that Beit Hanina had 65 houses and a population of 240, though the population count included only men. Hartmann found that Bet Hanina had 79 houses.

In 1883, the Palestine Exploration Fund's Survey of Western Palestine described it as a "village of moderate size, of stone houses, standing on very rocky ground on the ridge between two valleys. It is surrounded with olives, and has springs to the west at some little distance. Vineyards also occur near the village."

In 1896 the population of Bet Hanina was estimated to be about 792 persons.

=== British Mandate ===
In the 1922 census of Palestine conducted by the British Mandate authorities, "Bait Hanina" had a population of 996, all Muslims, increasing in the 1931 census to a population of 1226, still all Muslims, in 317 houses.

In a tradition recorded by Ben-Zvi in 1927, the Dar Abu-Zharir family of Beit Hanina claimed Jewish descent. Their progenitor, a Jewish peddler named Khalifa, settled in the village, married, and raised a family. The descendants openly acknowledged their Jewish roots, stating "Asalna min al-Yahud" (Arabic: أصلنا من اليهود, lit. 'We are from the Jews'). Elderly women in the family reportedly taught the younger generations the laws of female purity, and many members bore Jewish-sounding names like Sarah and Rebecca.

In the 1945 statistics Beit Hanina had a population of 1,590, all Muslims, with 14,948 dunams of land, according to an official land and population survey. Of this, 3,072 dunams were plantations and irrigable land, 4,304 used for cereals, while 219 dunams were built-up land.

=== Jordan ===
In the wake of the 1948 Arab–Israeli War, and after the 1949 Armistice Agreements, Beit Hanina came under Jordanian rule. It was annexed by Jordan in 1950. Under Jordanian rule, new roads and schools were built, and many of the town's émigrés invested in the development of a modern suburb, then known as Ras al-Tariq, located to the east along the Jerusalem-Ramallah highway.

In 1961, the population of Beit Hanina was 3,067, of whom 332 were Christian, the rest Muslim.

=== Israel ===
==== 20th century ====
Beit Hanina in the OCHAoPT map of evictions in East Jerusalem as at 2016

The population in the 1967 census conducted by the Israeli authorities was 1,177, of whom 36 originated from the Israeli territory.

Israel expanded the municipal boundaries of Jerusalem to include the eastern section of Beit Hanina, now known as Beit Hanina al-Jadid, and formalized that policy in 1980.

In the post-1967 era, according to Ibrahim Mattar, "The first objective of the Israeli planners in drawing these new boundaries was to maximize the land area and minimize the Palestinian population to be included in greater East Jerusalem. By examining the map, one can identify a number of Palestinian villages which have been excluded from the boundaries of greater East Jerusalem but whose lands have been included in these boundaries. For example, in the west, the villages of Beit Iksa and Beit Hanina are considered outside the boundaries while their lands are inside."

==== 21st century ====
According to ARIJ, Israel has confiscated 2, 927 dunams of land from Beit Hanina (33.1% of the total area) to construct four Israeli settlements:

- 1,458 dunams were taken for Pisgat Ze’ev,
- 686 dunams were taken for Pisgat Amir,
- 551 dunams were taken for Neveh Ya’akov,
- 232 dunams were taken for Ramat Shlomo.

Israel confiscated land from Beit Hanina el Balad (the old own):

- 134 dunams for Ramot, Jerusalem,
- 53 dunams for Ramat Shlomo

The 39% of the village land is isolated from the village by the Israeli West Bank barrier.

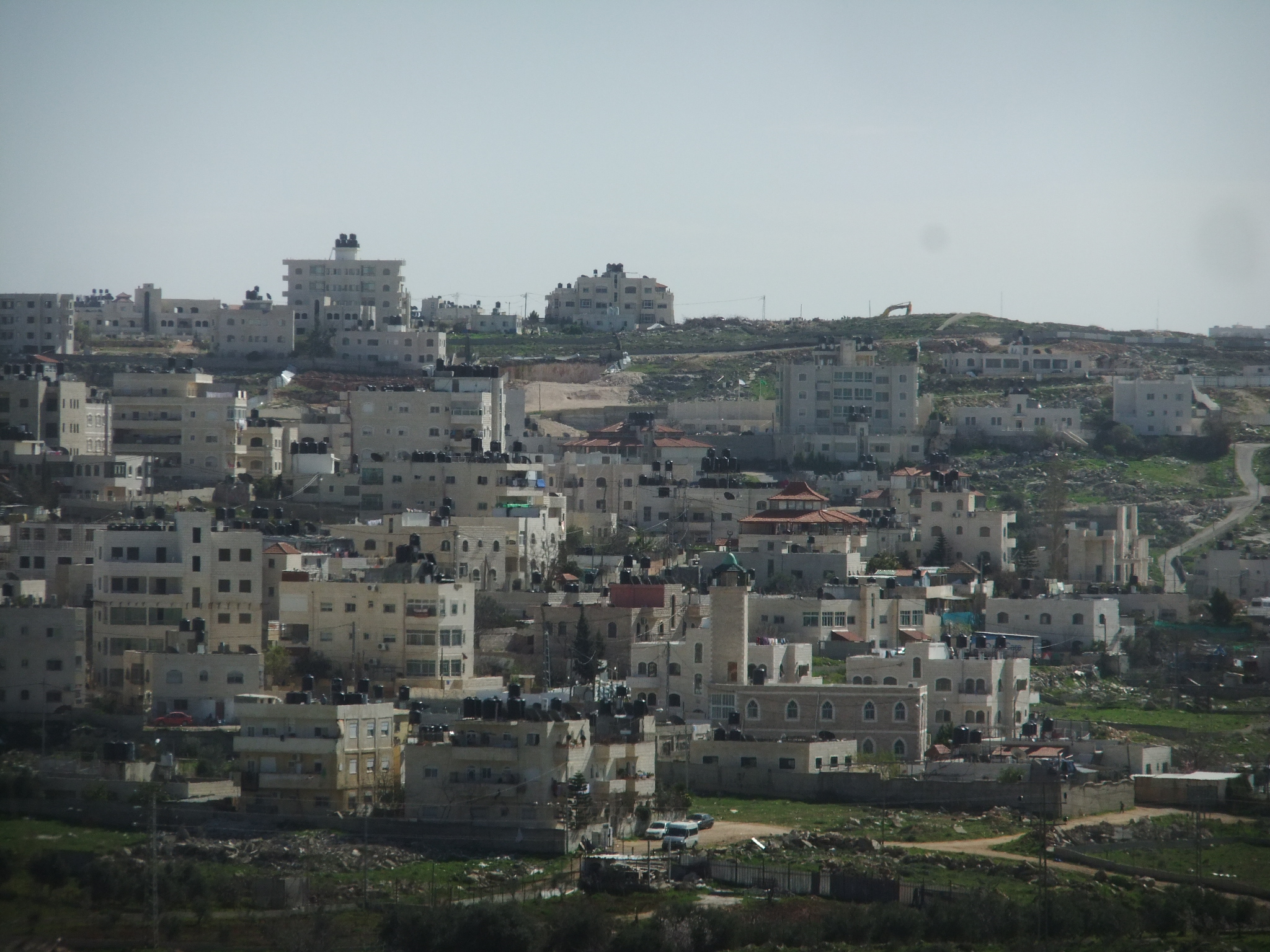
Beit Hanina as viewed from Atarot

After the Second Intifada, Israel began to build the Israeli West Bank barrier, which separated the Jerusalem section of Beit Hanina from the West Bank. Due to its urban nature, the route near the town is part of the 10% which employs a concrete wall. The area has sometimes been the scene of clashes between the Israeli security forces and Palestinian militant factions. On 18 April 2012, a Palestinian family, the Natshehs, was evicted from two houses in the wake of an Israeli court decision that the land was owned by Jews. The Israel Land Fund had purchased the buildings in 1977 as part of a plan for a Jewish neighborhood of 50 apartments called "Nof Shmuel." The Natsheh family stated that the documents were forged and that family members had owned part of the property since the 1940s, but the Israeli court dismissed it citing lack of evidence. The European Union condemned the eviction, and said they were very concerned by the plans to build a new settlement "in the midst of this traditional Palestinian neighborhood." On 27 April 2012 about 150 Palestinian, Israeli and foreign activists staged a protest that led to clashes with Israeli police.

After the 1995 accords, 12.2% of the village land is classified as Area B, while the remaining 87.8% were classified as Area C.

In 2012, a street in Beit Hanina was named for Umm Khulthum. Nasreen Kadari, winner of the TV reality show Eyal Golan is Calling You, sang one of the Egyptian singer's famous songs, "Enta Omri", at the ceremony.

Since 2012, two houses are populated by Jews.

An Israeli news site, Ynetnews.com, reported on 27 February 2014 on a report by the Palestinian newspaper Al-Quds that claimed that U.S. Secretary of State John Kerry offered in his discussions with Mahmoud Abbas, president of the Palestinian Authority, to make Beit Hanina the capital of a future Palestinian state. According to Al-Quds, Kerry demanded Abbas to officially recognize Israel as a Jewish state and offered that Beit Hanina neighborhood will be declared as the Palestinian capital instead of the entire east Jerusalem area.

== Education ==
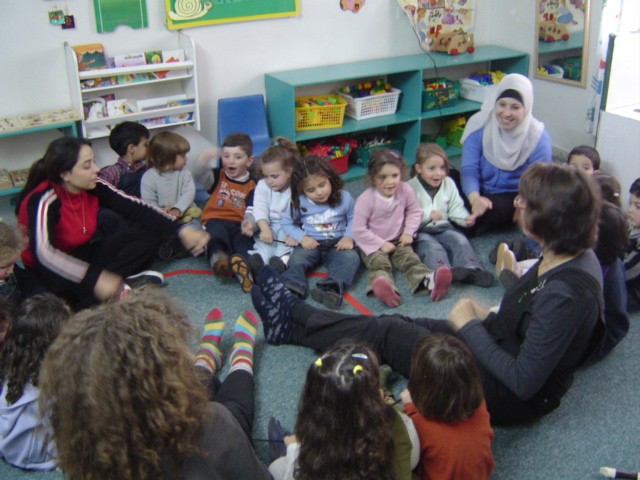
Kindergarten in Beit Hanina

The College of Daawa and Religious Principles was established in Beit Hanina in 1978. A branch of al-Quds University is also located there. There are four mosques in Beit Hanina: Sultan Ibrahim Ibn Adham Mosque, Bader Mosque, Mosque of Religion College, and Mosque of Teacher's Suburb. Christian schools include the Rosary Sisters and De La Salle. College des Freres built a new school in Beit Hanina in 2000. The Catholic Church runs a community center and St. Jacob's Church. In 2012, the Beit Hanina Girls School, serving grades 5–12, was renovated with funding from the Japanese government.

== Transportation ==
The neighbourhood's Main Street, Beit Hanina Road, was previously part of route 60. In the 1990s a new route was built to the east of the neighbourhood, a dual carriageway with 3 lanes in each direction, relieving traffic congestion along the road. The Jerusalem Light Rail has a stop in Beit Hanina.

In 2011, Israel began constructing a road that would link East Jerusalem neighborhoods, including Beit Hanina, to the center of West Jerusalem. According to the Israeli newspaper, Haaretz, "Peace Now representatives argue that the 'road's current route isn't legal, since the plan designates occupied territory for permanent infrastructures for the occupying power, while completely disregarding the needs of the Palestinian residents in Beit Hanina and the area.'"

== People connected to Beit Hanina ==
Abdul Hameed Shoman, a native of Beit Hanina, founded the Arab Bank. His son, Abdul-Majid Shoman, succeeded his father as the chairman of the Arab Bank in 1974. In 2005, The New York Times reported on the death of Abdul-Majid Shoman and explained that "Mr. Shoman was from a prominent Palestinian family from the West Bank town of Beit Hanina. His father, Abdul-Hamid Shoman, established the first branch of the Arab Bank in Jerusalem in 1930. The bank was a symbol of Palestinian aspirations, representing a drive to create financial institutions for a new nation." According to Lawrence Joffe,"Often Shoman rescued Jordan from fiscal disaster. In 2000 he released funds to support the Jordanian dinar, which had collapsed after King Hussein died."

Guy Delisle depicted his 2008–2009 stay in Beit Hanina in Jerusalem (comics).

In 2010, Akiva Eldar reported in Haaretz that the-then Palestinian Authority prime minister, Salam Fayyad, lived in Beit Hanina. Eldar wrote: "Last Tuesday we accompanied the Palestinian prime minister during his workday as a state-builder. Early in the morning his black Mercedes left the well-guarded villa in the Beit Hanina neighborhood on Jerusalem's northern outskirts. There Fayyad lives with his wife and his younger son, a student at a high school in the city."

== Environmental issues ==
Since Beit Hanina is an east Jerusalem village, it has the same environmental concerns as the rest of Palestine and Israel. In the journal article,"Scenario Development for 2050 for the Israeli/Palestinian Water Sector," Jonathan Chenoweth describes what can happen as the population increases with regard to water scarcity. Chenoweth states,"Already Israel and Palestine have very low water resources availability compared to the global average (Food and Agriculture Organization, 2004). In the case of Palestine, this water scarcity directly impacts upon daily life and economic activity for much of the population. With rapid population growth in the region and water resources already inadequate, the long-term hydrological future of region appears problematic."

== Gallery ==
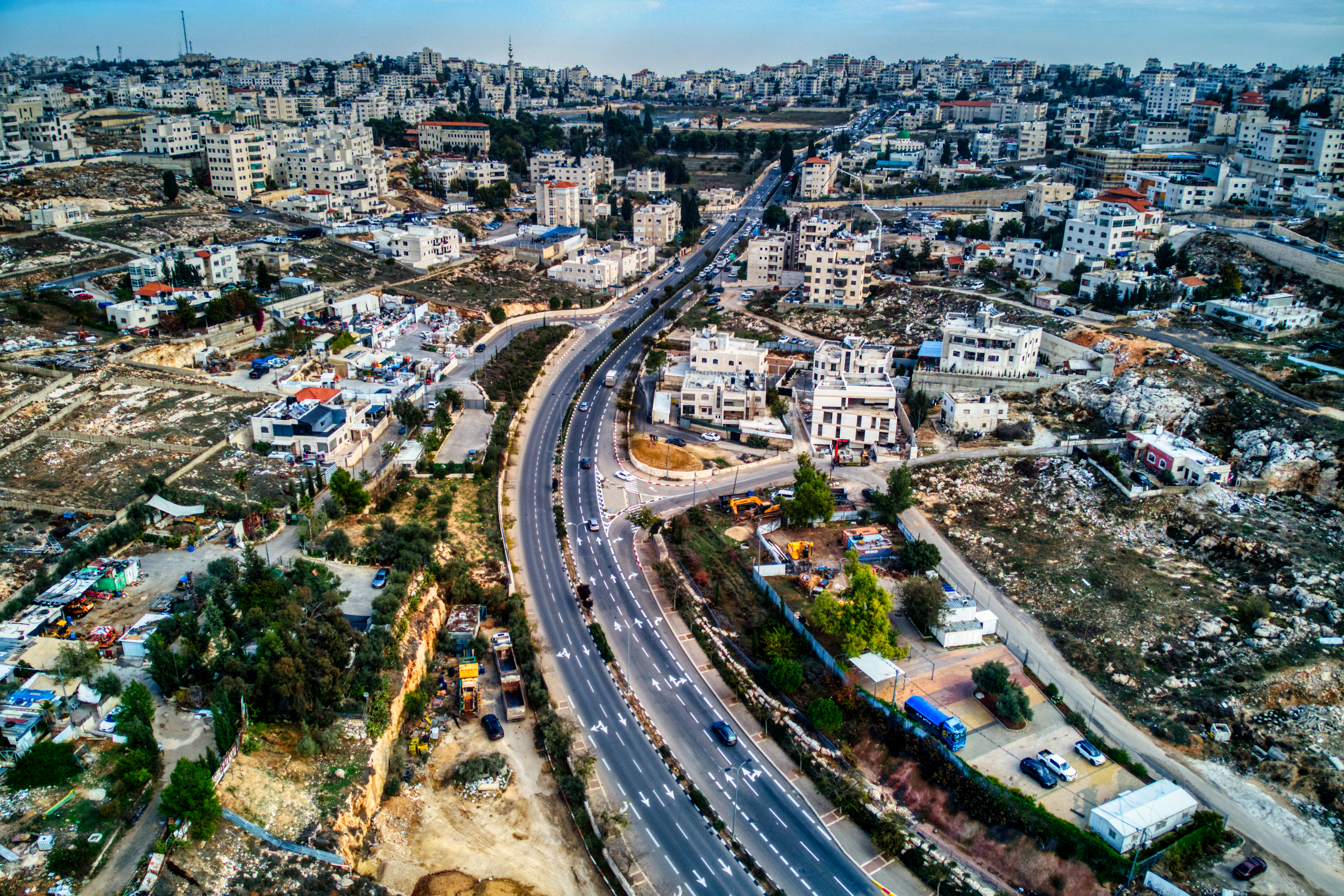
Abdul Hameed Shoman Street and its surroundings

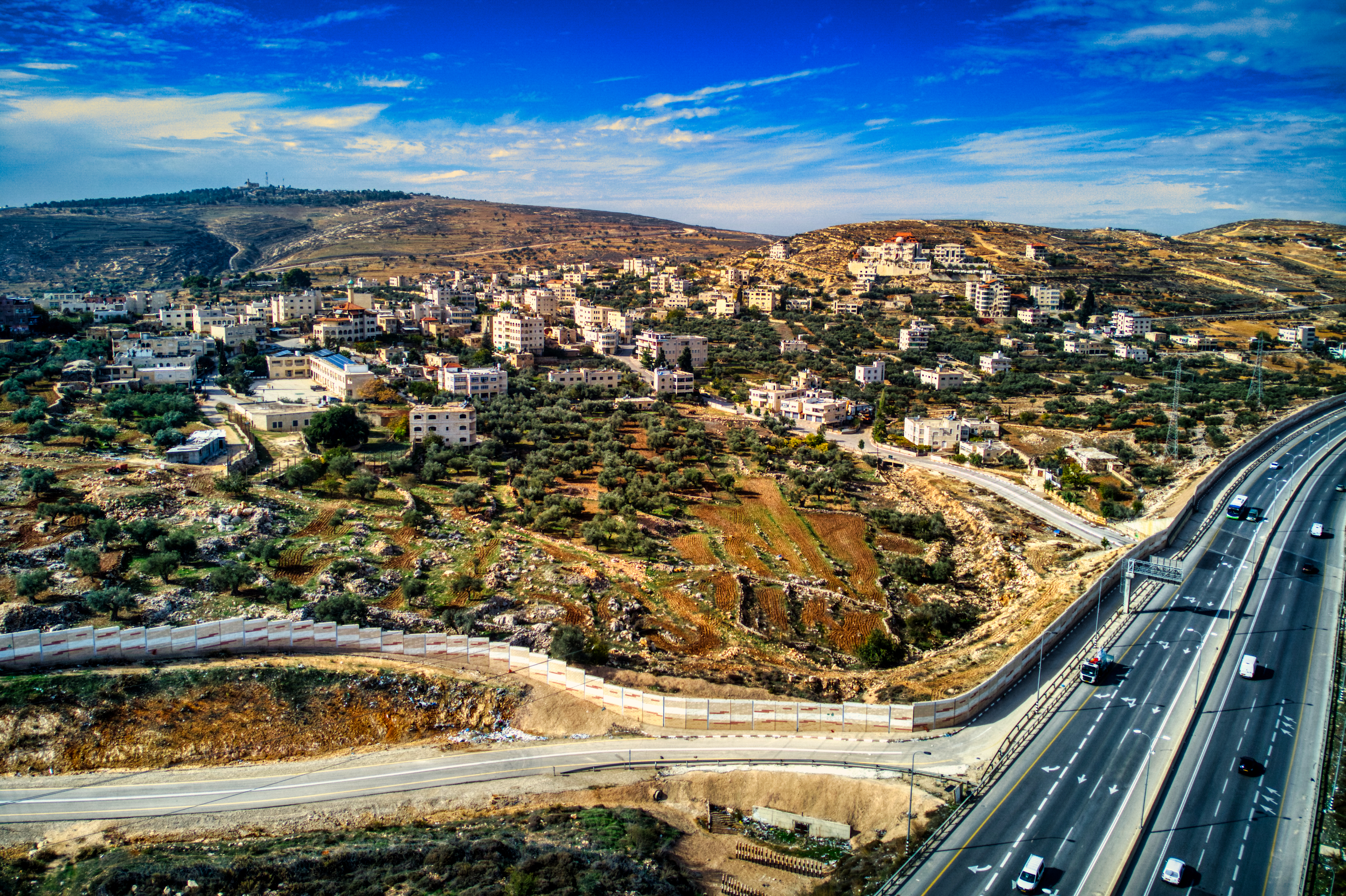
Old Beit Hanina (Al-Balad)

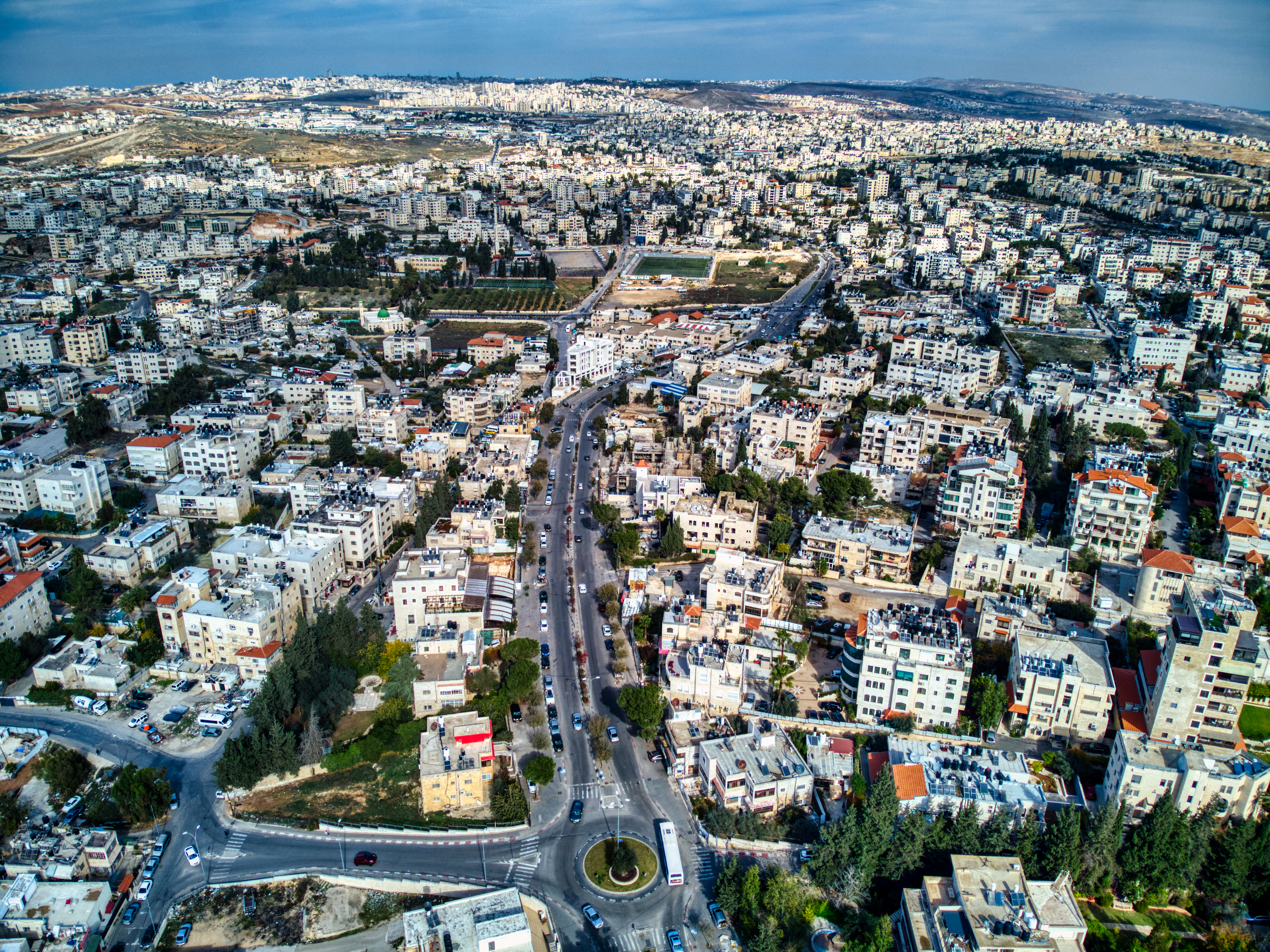
The Northern part of Beit Hanina

== Bibliography ==
- 'Adawi, Zubair (31 December 2012). "Jerusalem, Beit Hanina Final Report" (124). Hadashot Arkheologiyot – Excavations and Surveys in Israel. Archived from the original on 18 May 2013.
- 'Adawi, Zubair; Tori, Bilal (19 June 2014). "Jerusalem, Beit Hanina Final Report" (126). Hadashot Arkheologiyot – Excavations and Surveys in Israel.
- Barron, J. B., ed. (1923). Palestine: Report and General Abstracts of the Census of 1922. Government of Palestine.
- Canaan, T. (1927). Mohammedan Saints and Sanctuaries in Palestine. London: Luzac & Co. Archived from the original on 16 May 2019.
- Conder, C.R.; Kitchener, H. H. (1883). The Survey of Western Palestine: Memoirs of the Topography, Orography, Hydrography, and Archaeology. Vol. 3. London: Committee of the Palestine Exploration Fund.
- Government of Jordan, Department of Statistics (1964). First Census of Population and Housing. Volume I: Final Tables; General Characteristics of the Population (PDF).
- Government of Palestine, Department of Statistics (1945). Village Statistics, April, 1945.
- Guérin, V. (1868). Description Géographique Historique et Archéologique de la Palestine (in French). Vol. 1: Judee, pt. 1. Paris: L'Imprimerie Nationale.
- Hadawi, S. (1970). Village Statistics of 1945: A Classification of Land and Area ownership in Palestine. Palestine Liberation Organization Research Centre. Archived from the original on 8 December 2018.
- Hartmann, M. (1883). "Die Ortschaftenliste des Liwa Jerusalem in dem türkischen Staatskalender für Syrien auf das Jahr 1288 der Flucht (1871)". Zeitschrift des Deutschen Palästina-Vereins. 6: 102–149.
- Hütteroth, W.-D.; Abdulfattah, K. (1977). Historical Geography of Palestine, Transjordan and Southern Syria in the Late 16th Century. Erlanger Geographische Arbeiten, Sonderband 5. Erlangen, Germany: Vorstand der Fränkischen Geographischen Gesellschaft. ISBN 3-920405-41-2.
- Mills, E., ed. (1932). Census of Palestine 1931. Population of Villages, Towns and Administrative Areas. Jerusalem: Government of Palestine.
- Palmer, E. H. (1881). The Survey of Western Palestine: Arabic and English Name Lists Collected During the Survey by Lieutenants Conder and Kitchener, R. E. Transliterated and Explained by E.H. Palmer. Committee of the Palestine Exploration Fund.
- Robinson, E.; Smith, E. (1841). Biblical Researches in Palestine, Mount Sinai and Arabia Petraea: A Journal of Travels in the year 1838. Vol. 3. Boston: Crocker & Brewster.
- Schick, C. (1896). "Zur Einwohnerzahl des Bezirks Jerusalem". Zeitschrift des Deutschen Palästina-Vereins. 19: 120–127.
- Sharon, M. (1999). Corpus Inscriptionum Arabicarum Palaestinae, B-C. Vol. II. BRILL. ISBN 9004110836.
- Socin, A. (1879). "Alphabetisches Verzeichniss von Ortschaften des Paschalik Jerusalem". Zeitschrift des Deutschen Palästina-Vereins. 2: 135–163.
- Wiegmann, Alexander (28 August 2013). "Jerusalem, Beit Hanina, Survey" (125). Hadashot Arkheologiyot – Excavations and Surveys in Israel.
- Yeger, David (14 September 2014). "Jerusalem, Beit Hanina Final Report" (126). Hadashot Arkheologiyot – Excavations and Surveys in Israel.
- Zilberbod, Irina (30 July 2012). "Jerusalem, Beit Hanina (B) Final Report" (124). Hadashot Arkheologiyot – Excavations and Surveys in Israel. Archived from the original on 18 May 2013.
- Zilberbod, Irina (19 November 2012). "Jerusalem, Beit Hanina (A) Final Report" (124). Hadashot Arkheologiyot – Excavations and Surveys in Israel. Archived from the original on 18 May 2013.
