= Shuafat =

Palestinian Arab neighborhood in East Jerusalem

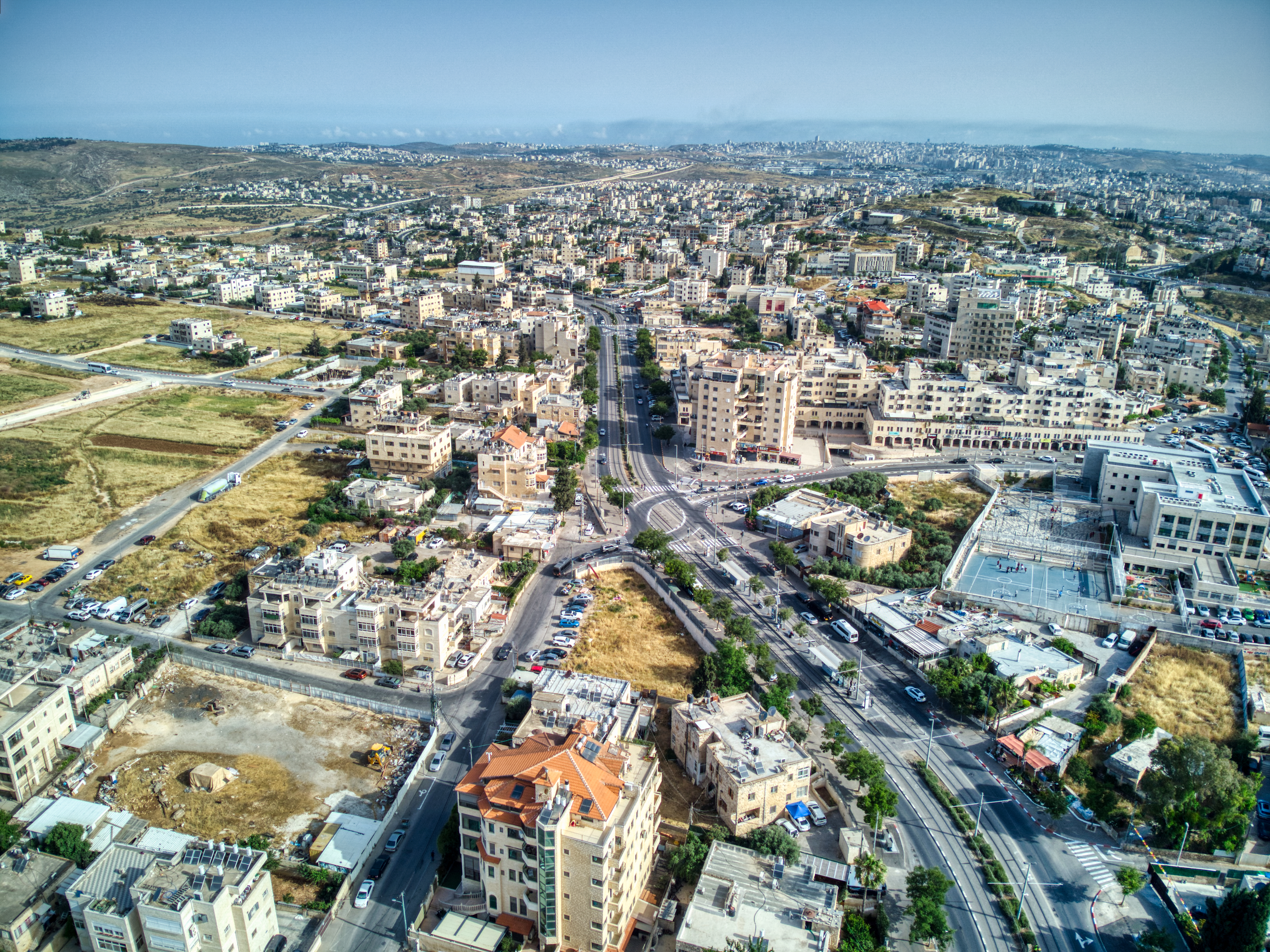
View of Shuafat

Shuafat (Arabic: شعفاط, romanized: Šuʿafāṭ), also Shu'fat and Sha'fat, is a mostly Palestinian Arab neighborhood of East Jerusalem, forming part of north-eastern Jerusalem. Located on the old Jerusalem–Ramallah road about three miles north of the Old City, Shu'fat has a population of 35,000 residents.

Next to the Shuafat neighbourhood there is a refugee camp of the same name, which was established by King Hussein of Jordan in 1965 to house Palestinian refugees from the Jerusalem, Lydda, Jaffa, and Ramleh areas, after the Muascar camp in the Jewish Quarter of the Old City had been closed.

Shuafat borders Pisgat Ze'ev and Beit Hanina on the north, Shu'fat refugee camp on the east, French Hill on the south, and Ramat Shlomo on the west. Shu'fat is located in the part of the West Bank which was included in the municipal boundaries of Jerusalem after its occupation in 1967.

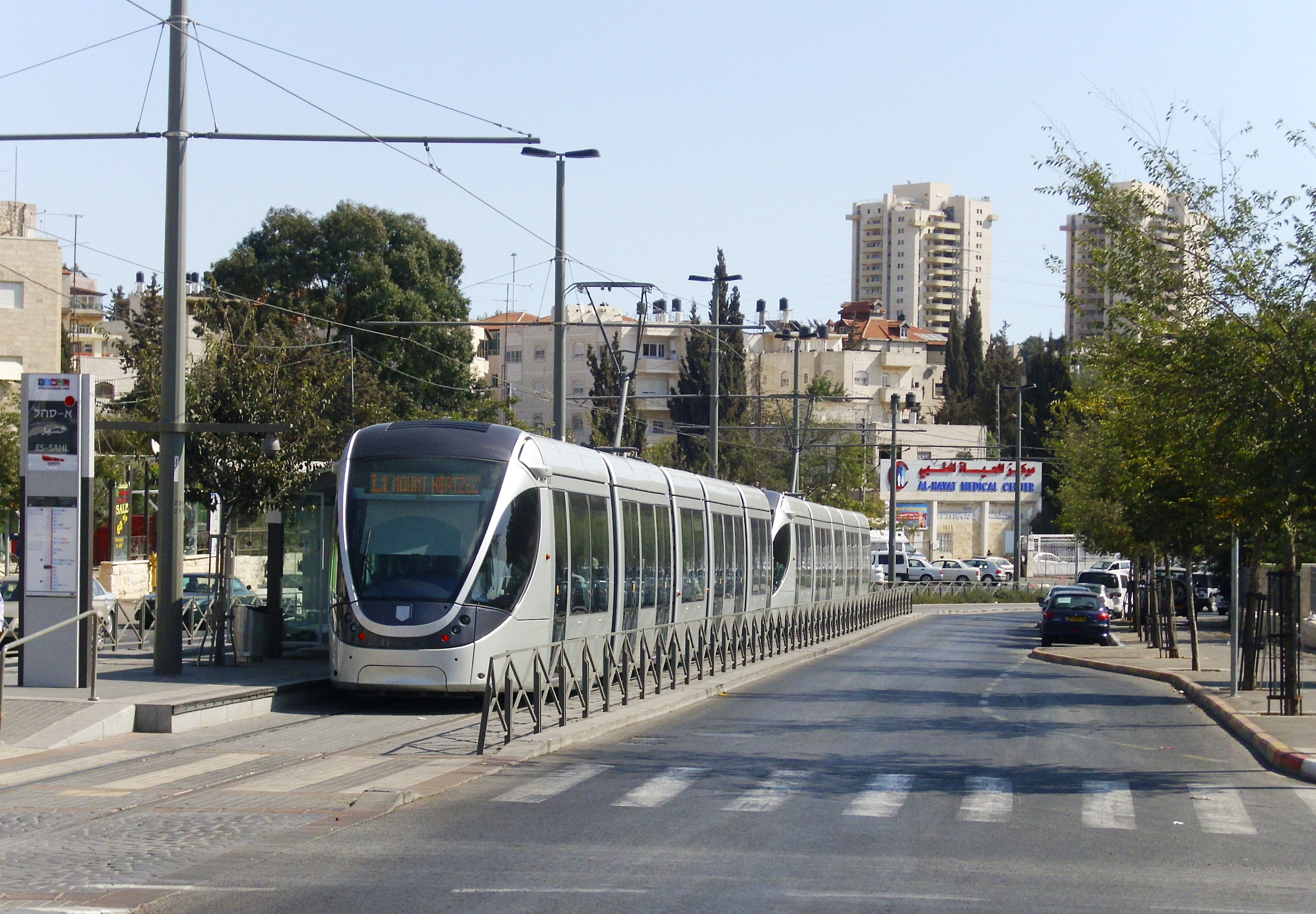
The Jerusalem Light Rail in Shuafat

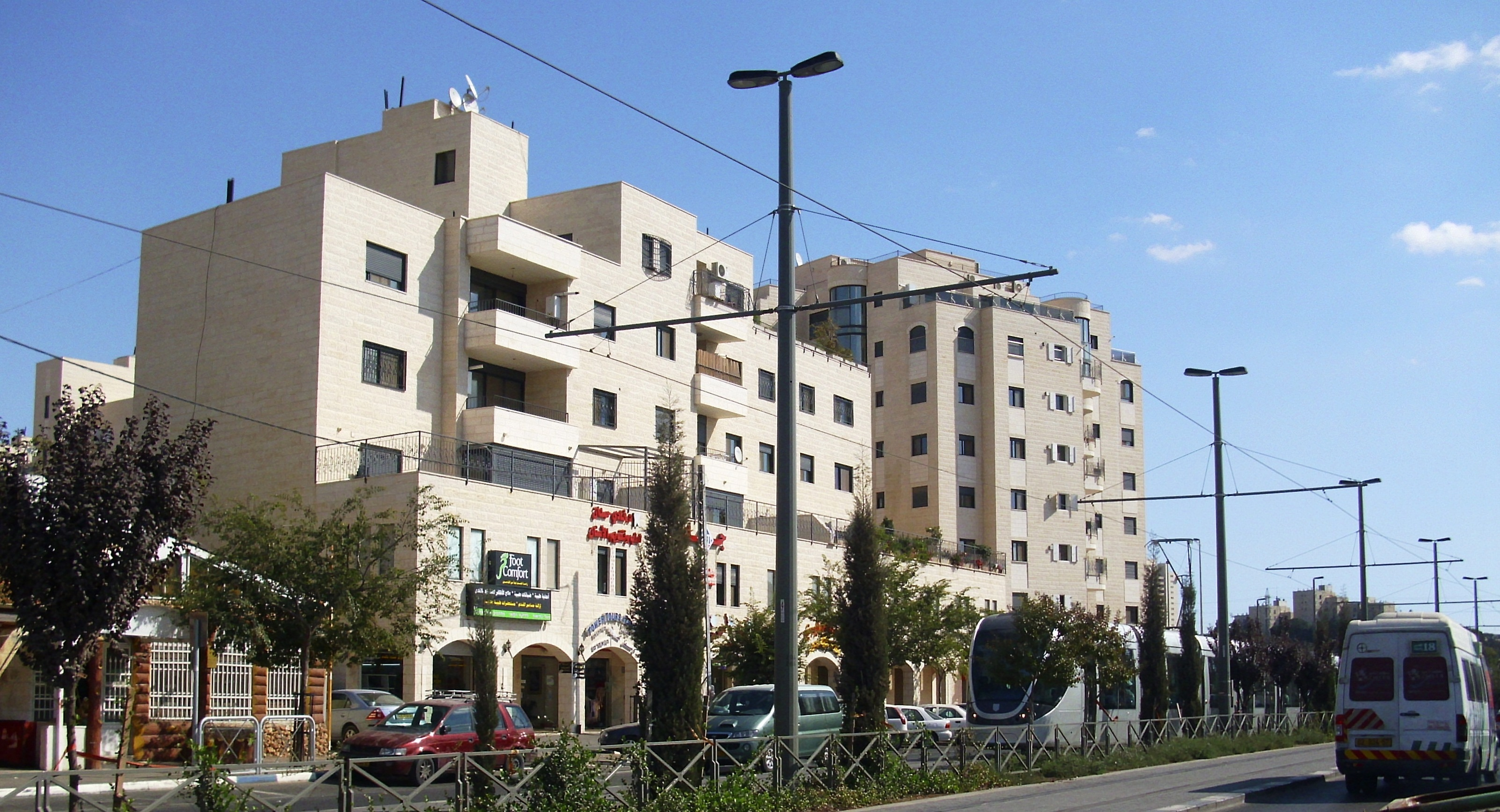
Shuafat Road

== Etymology ==
Conder and Kitchener suggested that Shuafat's name derives from the Jewish king Jehoshaphat, but it could be a corruption of Mizphe or Sapha. It is possible that the name of this town was altered by the Crusaders or that it was slightly modified from the word Sh'af (plural Sh'afat), which means mountain top.

Edward Henry Palmer gave "p.n" as the meaning for the name, (""p.n": (proper name) after a name, mean either that it is a common Arabic personal appellation, or that it is a word to which no meaning can be assigned"), and added "The village is said by the peasantry to have been named after a king Shafat (perhaps Jehoshaphat)."

Charles Simon Clermont-Ganneau reported several traditions regarding the name of the village. According to one tradition, told by a local woman, Sha'fat was known in ancient times under the name of Alaikou. According to a second tradition, it was known in the past as Deir Mahruk, "the burned covent". A third tale, "evidently of Christian origin", also linked the place to Jehoshaphat. It asserted that "there was once upon a time at Sha'fat a king named Yachafat, who is mentioned in the Tora; it was he who gave his name to the country". Clermont-Ganneau noted that the Hebrew name Jehoshaphat does not contain the 'ayin that exists in Sha'fat, and therefore, this tale was an "entirely artificial tradition", which was possibly influenced by the nearby valley of Josaphat.

== History ==
The area of Shuafat has been intermittently settled, with the oldest architectural findings dating to the Chalcolithic period 7000 years ago. Findings from the 2nd–1st century BC revealed the presence of a fortified agricultural settlement by that period. The settlement reached its largest size in the Roman period, between 70–130 CE, before being abandoned or destroyed after the 135 CE Bar Kokhba Revolt, only to be re-inhabited on a smaller scale in the 2nd–4th centuries.

Late 19th-century Biblical historians have suggested that it might be linked to Mizpah in Benjamin, and Nob, while one 21st-century review suggested Gebim, though cautioning that it remains uncertain.

=== Second Temple ===
Following a 1991 archaeological dig conducted by Alexander Onn and Tzvi Greenhut which unearthed a 2nd century BCE fortified agricultural settlement near Shuafat, an underground room in the complex was dated to the early first century BCE, and identified as a prayer room or synagogue. Subsequently, this interpretation of the site was strongly questioned. In 2008, Rachel Hachlili stated that the structure is no longer considered to have been a synagogue. The settlement was abandoned after being severely damaged by the 31 BCE earthquake.

Jewish tombs dating to this period have also been discovered at Ramat Shlomo, at what was formerly known as Shuafat Ridge. A large quarry, possibly linked to Herod's expansion of the Second Temple, dating to the period has also been found in Ramat Shlomo.

During an archaeological salvage dig conducted near the Shuafat refugee camp in preparation for the laying of the tracks for the Jerusalem Light Rail system, the remains of a Jewish settlement from the Roman period were discovered. The settlement was on the main Roman road leading northward from Jerusalem towards Shechem/Flavia Neapolis. It was inhabited between the two main revolts of the Jews against the Romans, as it was established after the destruction of Jerusalem in 70 CE and was suddenly abandoned around 130 CE, shortly before the outbreak of the Bar Kokhba revolt (132–36). This settlement is thought to have been inhabited by elite Jewish families, including priests, who stayed close to Jerusalem after its destruction, possibly in anticipation of the temple's future restoration. It is described as a 'sophisticated community impeccably planned by the Roman authorities, with orderly rows of houses and two fine public bathhouses to the north.'

At the time of its discovery, the site was said to be the first indication of an active Jewish settlement in the area of Jerusalem after the city fell in 70 CE, and with a presumed total surface area of c. 11 dunams (minimum length 310 m, width c. 35 m), it was also considered the largest Jewish settlement of the time "in the vicinity of Jerusalem". The main indication that the settlement was a Jewish one is the large and varied assemblage of chalkstone vessels found there. Such vessels, for food storage and serving, were only used by Jews because they were believed not to transmit impurity. Some of the vessels discovered there belong to a type only found after 70 CE. An even more conclusive archaeological evidence of the Jewish character of a settlement is the presence of Jewish ritual baths, several of which were found during later work.

The presence of the public bathhouses, the delay in finding Jewish ritual baths, and the discovery of imported Italian and Greek wine produced by non-Jews, which the very purity-concerned Jews of the time would have avoided, made researchers at first speculate whether the settlement might have been a mixed Jewish-Roman (pagan) one, with the bathhouses operated by Jews for the benefit of Roman soldiers. The quality of the buildings and other findings, such rich coin hoards, cosmetics, stone vessels and imported wine, attest to the wealth of the inhabitants.

=== Roman and Byzantine empires ===
The abandoned or destroyed site was resettled on a smaller scale in the second–fourth centuries CE, with agricultural terraces recently exposed west of Shuʽfat Street.

=== Caliphates and Crusaders ===
The place was known to the Crusaders as Dersophath or Dersophach. In March 1179, it was noted that its revenues went to the abbey of St Mary of Mount Sion as the result of a grant made by Anselm de Parenti.

Remains of a Crusader structure in the center of the village have been found. Guérin thought it was possibly a church: "One [house] which still today bears the name El-Kniseh (the church), presents the remains of a Christian sanctuary facing east, whose windows were pointed and which dates in all likelihood from the Middle Ages. Some fine ashlars of antique appearance had been used, along with other smaller material, in the construction of this little church." However, Schick found no church, "simply an old Crusading building with two preserved windows. The walls are about 6 feet thick, against which the fellaheen houses are built and so it is not easy to recognise. It was a kind of khan built in the usual Crusading way, with a vault a little higher in the middle than semi-circular." Seikh 'Abd-allah's tomb was built on top of this church.

Archaeologists discovered that agricultural terraces from the area were built and covered with topsoil during the Mamluk period (1260–1516).

=== Ottoman Empire ===
The village was incorporated into the Ottoman Empire in 1517 with all of Palestine, and in 1596 Shuafat appeared in Ottoman tax registers as being in the Nahiya of Quds of the Liwa of Quds. It had eight Muslim families who paid taxes on wheat, barley, vineyards and other agricultural produce; a total of 2,200 akçe.

In 1838, Edward Robinson described Shuafat as a small Muslim village with the remains of an old wall, while de Saulcy, who saw it in 1851, wrote that "this village has the appearance of a castle of the middle ages with a square keep."

The French explorer Guérin visited in 1863 and noted that the village was situated on an elevated plateau "from which one can make out perfectly the cupolas and minarets of Jerusalem," and that it counted 150 inhabitants. He described the houses as for the most part fairly old and vaulted internally. He noted the remains of a church called al-Kanisa, facing east. He thought it was a Frankish church. He also passed by in 1870. An official Ottoman village list from about 1870 showed 23 houses and a population of 90, counting men only.

In 1883, the Palestine Exploration Fund's Survey of Western Palestine described Shuafat as "A small village, standing on a flat spur immediately west of the watershed, surrounded with olive-trees. It has wells to the north. There is a sacred chapel of Sultan Ibrahim in the village." In 1896 the population of Scha'fat was estimated to be about 276 persons.

The Ottomans built a road in the same place as the old Roman road linking Jerusalem to Nablus.

=== British Mandate ===
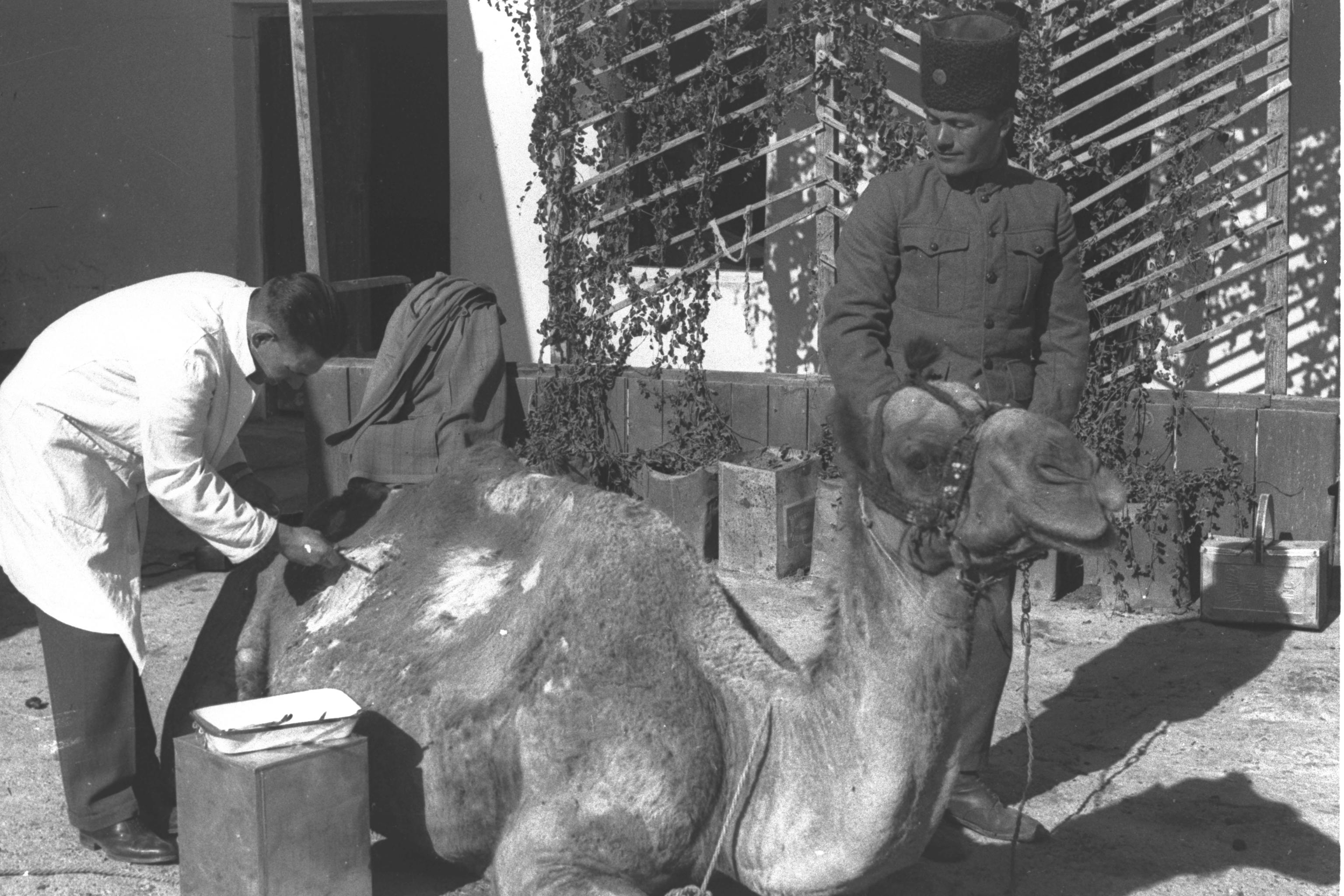
Government veterinary station at Shuafat in 1934

In the 1922 census of Palestine conducted by the British Mandate authorities, Sha'afat had a population of 422, all Muslims, increasing in the 1931 census to 539, still all Muslims, in 123 houses.

In the 1945 statistics the population of Shu'fat was 760, all Muslims, and it had 5,215 dunams of land according to an official land and population survey. 484 dunams were for plantations and irrigable land, 2,111 for cereals, while 62 dunams were built-up (urban) land.

=== Jordan ===
The town of Shuafat was to be the most northernmost point of the corpus separatum proposed in 1947 for Jerusalem and its surrounding villages, which "in view of its association with three world religions" was to be "accorded special and separate treatment from the rest of Palestine and should be placed under effective United Nations control".

In mid-February, during the 1948 Arab–Israeli War, Abd al-Qadir al-Husayni, leader of Palestinian irregulars in the area, tried to persuade the residents of Shuafat to attack the neighbouring Jewish village of Neve Yaakov but the invitation was declined. On 13 May the villagers were evacuated on orders from the Arab Legion. Shortly afterwards the Palmach captured Shuafat, destroying many of the buildings. Shuafat was then occupied by Jordan, which annexed the West Bank in April 1950.

Jordan's king Hussein also built a palace here.

In 1961, the population of Shuafat was 2,541, of whom 253 were Christian.

==== Shuafat refugee camp ====
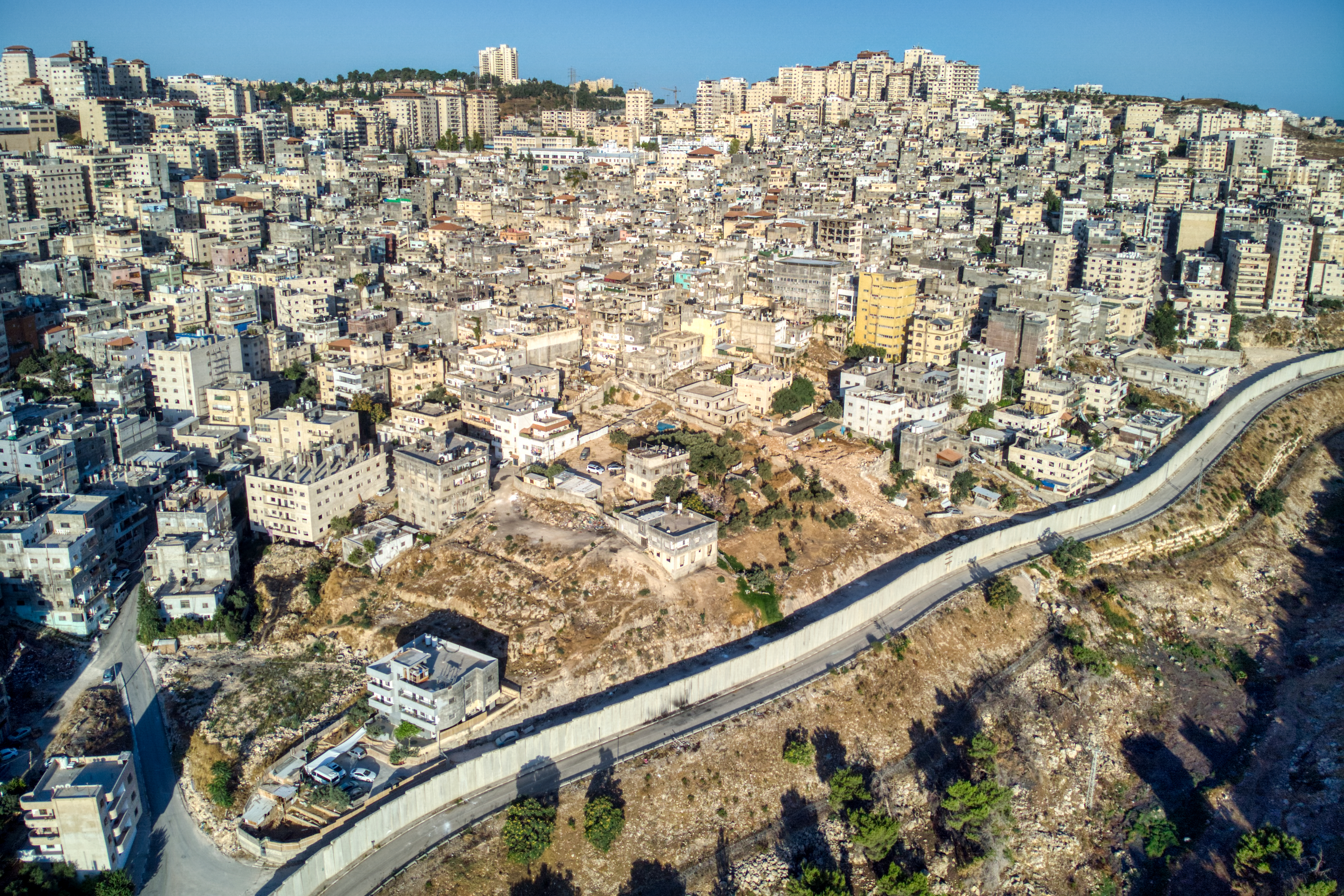
Shuafat camp, 2023

In the wake of the 1948 war, the Red Cross accommodated Palestinian refugees in the depopulated and partly destroyed Jewish Quarter of Jerusalem's Old City. This grew into the Muaska refugee camp managed by UNRWA, which housed refugees from 48 locations now in Israel. Over time many poor non-refugees also settled in the camp. Conditions became unsafe for habitation due to lack of maintenance and sanitation, but neither UNRWA nor the Jordanian government wanted the negative international response that would result if they demolished the old Jewish houses.

In 1964, a decision was made to move the refugees to a new camp constructed on mostly Jewish land near Shuafat. Most of the refugees refused to move, since it would mean losing their livelihood, the market and the tourists, as well as reducing their access to the holy sites. In the end, many of the refugees were moved to Shuafat by force during 1965 and 1966.

=== Israel ===
==== 20th century ====
After the Six-Day War in 1967, East Jerusalem, including the town and refugee camp, was occupied and later annexed by Israel and were incorporated into the Jerusalem municipal district. The residents were offered Israeli citizenship, but most refused it as they considered the area to be illegally occupied. Many accepted permanent residency status instead.

According to ARIJ, Israel has illegally and unilaterally redrawn the boundaries of Jerusalem Municipality, and confiscated 3,989 dunams of Shu’fat land (47% of the total town's area) in order to establish five Israeli settlements:

- 1,494 dunams for Rekhes Shufat (Ramat Shlomo)
- 1,446 dunams for Ramot (Ramot Allon)
- 416 dunams for Ramat Eshkol
- 239 dunams for Pisgat Amir
- 394 dunams for Giva't Shappira (French Hill)

The Shuafat refugee camp is the only Palestinian refugee camp located inside Jerusalem or any other Israeli-administered area. While its residents carry Jerusalem identity cards, which grants them the same privileges and rights as regular Israelis, the camp itself is largely serviced by the United Nations Relief and Works Agency, even though 40 - 50% of the camp's population are not registered refugees. The Israeli West Bank barrier was partially constructed between the camp and the rest of Shuafat and Jerusalem. Some health services are provided by Israeli clinics in the camp. The Israeli presence is limited to checkpoints controlling entry and exit. According to Ir Amim, the camp suffers from high crime as Israeli Police rarely enter due to security concerns and the Palestinian Civil Police Force do not operate in Israeli-administered municipalities. Unlike other UN-run refugee camps, residents of Shuafat camp pay taxes to the Israeli authorities.

The Shuafat Ridge next to the township was declared a 'green zone' to stop Palestinians in Shuafat from building there, until the opportunity arose to unfreeze its status as a green area and open it up for a new Jewish neighbourhood, as Teddy Kollek openly admitted.

==== 21st century ====
In a survey conducted as part of the research for the book Negotiating Jerusalem (2000), it was reported that 59% of Israeli Jews supported redefining the borders of the city of Jerusalem so as to exclude Arab settlements such as Shuafat, in order to ensure a "Jewish majority" in Jerusalem.

In July 2001, the Israeli authorities destroyed 14 homes under construction in Shuafat on the orders of then mayor Ehud Olmert, who said the structures were built without permits. No one was yet living in them. The families acknowledged they do not own the land they built on, but believed they had permission to build there from Islamic Trust religious authorities and argue that obtaining permits to build legally is nearly impossible. Olmert said the houses were being constructed on public land in a "green area" and posed a security threat to the Jews of Pisgat Zeev. According to Isabel Kershner of the New York Times, Shuafat suffered from an absence of municipal planning, overcrowding, and potholed roads in 2007.

As prime minister, Ehud Olmert questioned whether the annexation of areas like Shuafat into the Jerusalem area was necessary. The Israeli initiative to transfer control of the area to the Palestinian National Authority led to a split in the community: A camp official favored being under Palestinian sovereignty, while the neighborhood's mukhtar rejected the plan, citing his residents' participation in Israeli elections as well as the danger of Palestinian rocket attacks on Israel.

In 2012, Sorbonne scholar Prof. Sylvaine Bulle cited the Shuafat refugee camp for its urban renewal dynamic, seeing it as an example of a creative adaptation to the fragmented space of the camps towards creating a bricolage city, with businesses relocating from east Jerusalem there and new investment in commercial projects.

Three stations of the First 'Red' Line of the Jerusalem Light Rail are situated in Shuafat: Shuafat North, Shuafat Central and Shuafat South. The neighbourhood's Main Street, Shuafat Road, was previously part of route 60. In the 1990s a new route was built to the east of the neighbourhood, a dual carriageway with 3 lines in each direction, relieving traffic congestion along the road.

In 2014, the 16-year-old Mohammed Abu Khdeir was kidnapped from near his home in Shuafat. He was then murdered by the Jewish extremists who had kidnapped him.

== See also ==
- List of places in Jerusalem

== Bibliography ==
- Adler, Yonatan (2014). "3. Chalkstone Vessels". In Steven Fine, Aaron Koller (ed.). Tosefta Shabbat 1:14 - "Come and See the Extent to Which Purity Had Spread": An Archaeological Perspective on the Historical Background to a Late Tannaitic Passage. Studia Judaica (Book 73). de Gruyter. p. 78. ISBN 9781614514855.
- Bauckham, R. (1995). The Book of Acts in Its Palestinian Setting. Grand Rapids, Michigan: Wm. B. Eerdmans Publishing. ISBN 0-85364-566-3.
- Barron, J. B., ed. (1923). Palestine: Report and General Abstracts of the Census of 1922. Government of Palestine.
- Conder, C.R.; Kitchener, H.H. (1883). The Survey of Western Palestine: Memoirs of the Topography, Orography, Hydrography, and Archaeology. Vol. 3. London: Committee of the Palestine Exploration Fund.
- Ellenblum, R. (2003). Frankish Rural Settlement in the Latin Kingdom of Jerusalem. Cambridge University Press. ISBN 9780521521871.
- Geikie, C. (1887). The Holy Land and the Bible. Vol. 2. London: Cassell.
- Government of Jordan, Department of Statistics (1964). First Census of Population and Housing. Volume I: Final Tables; General Characteristics of the Population (PDF).
- Government of Palestine, Department of Statistics (1945). Village Statistics, April, 1945.
- Guérin, V. (1868). Description Géographique Historique et Archéologique de la Palestine (in French). Vol. 1: Judee, pt. 1. Paris: L'Imprimerie Nationale.
- Guérin, V. (1874). Description Géographique Historique et Archéologique de la Palestine (in French). Vol. 2: Samarie, pt. 1. Paris: L'Imprimerie Nationale.
- Hadawi, S. (1970). Village Statistics of 1945: A Classification of Land and Area ownership in Palestine. Palestine Liberation Organization Research Center.
- Hartmann, M. (1883). "Die Ortschaftenliste des Liwa Jerusalem in dem türkischen Staatskalender für Syrien auf das Jahr 1288 der Flucht (1871)". Zeitschrift des Deutschen Palästina-Vereins. 6: 102–149.
- Hütteroth, W.-D.; Abdulfattah, K. (1977). Historical Geography of Palestine, Transjordan and Southern Syria in the Late 16th Century. Erlanger Geographische Arbeiten. Vol. Sonderband 5. Erlangen, Germany: Vorstand der Fränkischen Geographischen Gesellschaft. ISBN 3-920405-41-2.
- Mills, E., ed. (1932). Census of Palestine 1931. Population of Villages, Towns and Administrative Areas. Jerusalem: Government of Palestine.
- Morris, B. (1987). The Birth of the Palestinian refugee problem, 1947-1949. Cambridge University Press. ISBN 0-521-33028-9.
- Morris, B. (2004). The Birth of the Palestinian Refugee Problem Revisited. Cambridge University Press. ISBN 978-0-521-00967-6.
- Palmer, E. H. (1881). The Survey of Western Palestine: Arabic and English Name Lists Collected During the Survey by Lieutenants Conder and Kitchener, R. E. Transliterated and Explained by E.H. Palmer. Committee of the Palestine Exploration Fund.
- Pringle, D. (1997). Secular buildings in the Crusader Kingdom of Jerusalem: an archaeological gazetteer. Cambridge University Press. ISBN 0521-46010-7.
- Pringle, D. (1998). The Churches of the Crusader Kingdom of Jerusalem: Volume II L-Z (excluding Tyre). Cambridge University Press. ISBN 0-521-39037-0.
- Robinson, E.; Smith, E. (1841). Biblical Researches in Palestine, Mount Sinai and Arabia Petraea: A Journal of Travels in the year 1838. Vol. 2. Boston: Crocker & Brewster.
- Robinson, E.; Smith, E. (1841). Biblical Researches in Palestine, Mount Sinai and Arabia Petraea: A Journal of Travels in the year 1838. Vol. 3. Boston: Crocker & Brewster.
- Röhricht, R. (1893). (RRH) Regesta regni Hierosolymitani (MXCVII-MCCXCI) (in Latin). Berlin: Libraria Academica Wageriana.
- Saulcy, L.F. de (1854). Narrative of a journey round the Dead Sea, and in the Bible lands, in 1850 and 1851. Vol. 1, new edition. London: R. Bentley.
- Schick, C. (1891). "Reports from Jerusalem - Letters from Herr Schick" (PDF). Quarterly Statement - Palestine Exploration Fund. 23: 198–204. doi:10.1179/peq.1891.23.3.198.
- Schick, C. (1896). "Zur Einwohnerzahl des Bezirks Jerusalem". Zeitschrift des Deutschen Palästina-Vereins. 19: 120–127.
- Socin, A. (1879). "Alphabetisches Verzeichniss von Ortschaften des Paschalik Jerusalem". Zeitschrift des Deutschen Palästina-Vereins. 2: 135–163.
- Tobler, T. (1854). Dr. Titus Toblers zwei Bücher Topographie von Jerusalem und seinen Umgebungen (in German). Vol. 2. Berlin: G. Reimer. (pp. 899- 890)
