= Shkoon =

Band

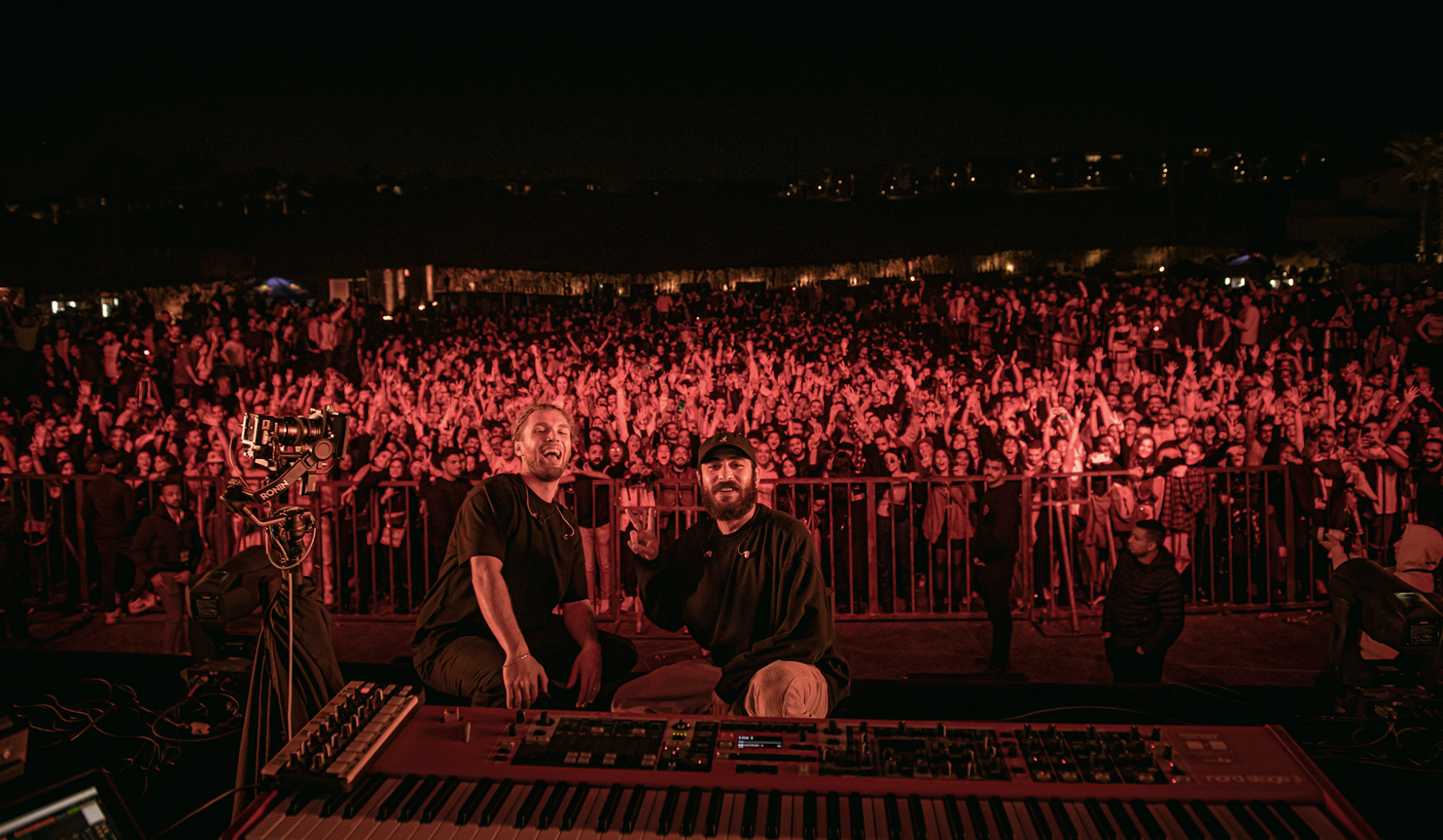
- Diekmann (left) and Khayer (right) at a concert in Cairo in 2022

Background information
- Origin: Hamburg, Germany
- Genres: Dance; electronic
- Years active: 2015–present
- Members: Thorben Diekmann; Ameen Khayer
- Website: shkoon-music.com

Shkoon (Levantine Arabic: شكون, pronounced [ʃkuːn]; transl. "What?") is a German–Syrian band based in Hamburg, Germany. The band was formed in 2015 when Ameen Khayer (born in Deir ez-Zor, Syria) and Thorben Diekmann (born in Hamburg) met during a spontaneous jam session in their flat. Their music is a message for cultural diversity that mixes old traditional music elements of the Arab community, such as Syrian folklore with modern electronic beats. Shkoon released their debut album Rima in 2019, followed by their live album Firaq in 2022, and their latest studio album Masrahiya in 2023.

== History ==
=== Formation and name ===
Khayer arrived in Germany in 2015 as a Syrian refugee. He shared a flat with Thorben and ten others, and everything began with a spontaneous jam session between the two. Khayer loved to sing Mawwal and Thorben was a musician, their musical bond was a coincidence that led to the start of their collaboration. Khayer had never pursued music before, but he was passionate about Arabic music. Thorben, on the other hand, brought a complementary skill set that balanced their partnership. The first Arabic word that Khayer taught Thorben was shkūn, meaning "what" in the Arabic dialect spoken in Deir ez-Zor. The band started with no name and in their early days, audiences often approached them, curious to know what type of music they played because they weren't familiar with the genre; this frequent question inspired the band's name.

=== Early life and background ===
==== Ameen Khayer ====
Khayer was born and raised in Deir ez-Zor, Syria, in a liberal and open-minded family. His father was an artist, his mother a primary school teacher, and he has one brother and one sister. After completing high school, he moved to Latakia, Syria to study marine engineering in 2011, when the Syrian civil war started. In 2014, a political-driven dispute among university students resulted in Khayer being held by the secret police for 34 days because he was a rebel against his government. He was later released on clemency grounds. In 2015, he left Syria for Turkey by land to seek safety and continue his education but this plan didn't work out He then decided to move to Germany, but as a Syrian refugee, an airplane and a safe trip weren't an option. After crossing the sea to the Greek island of Lesbos, he traveled through Macedonia, Serbia, Hungary, and Austria, reportedly walking around 6,500 kilometers from Lesbos to Germany. After Shkoon was formed, Khayer faced significant challenges obtaining visa approvals due to his refugee status in Germany, which limited him to a blue passport, a travel document for refugees. As a result, they had to decline many requests for shows, and Thorben was forced to perform without Khayer twice.

==== Thorben Diekmann ====
Diekmann's passion for music started when he started learning piano at the age of nine. He practiced music his whole life so he is a trained musician. By the time he met Khayer, he had recently started collaborating with others on music production. However, after facing challenges in teamwork, he decided to work independently. Yet, their bond was powerful enough to make him reconsider his decision. In addition to his passion for music, Thorben volunteered with various organizations that collected donations for Syrian refugees who arrived in Germany in 2015, which eventually led him to meet his teammate.

== Music style and influence ==
Shkoon's music is a mix of oriental melodies and occidental electronic. Their work builds bridges between underground music and the traditional Arab culture, allowing Arabs from all over the world to reconnect with their roots through music in a modern way, and Westerners to discover Arabic folklore in a language they understand, electronic music. More specifically, their music blends influences from electronic downbeat, deep house, dub, and hip-hop, combining piano, violin, synthesizers, percussion, and vocals with a fusion of oriental melodies and Western electronic rhythms. Therefore, their music is a message of cultural diversity. Their approach to music creation is as spontaneous as their initial meeting. They do not refer to a specific structure when composing; instead, they follow the path that the music guides them on their journey. In 2015, they released their debut album, Rima, which was successful and resulted in performances in cities throughout Europe, the Middle East, and North Africa. Their concerts consistently sell out, with fans queuing for hours in advance to immerse themselves in the new musical spheres. In 2022, they released a live album, Firaq, containing 15 tracks. Their latest album, Masrahiya, which means "theater performance" in Arabic (مسرحية), was released in 2023 and conveys a message that highlights the duality of people and how they often pretend to be someone else, wearing metaphorical masks in the world.

== Discography ==
=== Albums ===
Rima (2019)
No.	Title	Length
1.	"Ya Galbi"	6:36
2.	"Rima feat. El far3i"	4:43
3.	"Yamo"	5:46
4.	"040417"	1:38
5.	"F*cked up Two"	4:15
6.	"Ramallah"	7:23
7.	"B2"	6:42
8.	"Fatoum"	8:07
9.	"Strange World"	3:27
10.	"Amdah"	7:04
11.	"Bayat"	7:47
Total length:		1:03:00

Firaq (2022)
No.	Title	Length
1.	"Firaq"	3:15
2.	"Refraction"	5:36
3.	"QQQ"	5:06
4.	"A03"	5:19
5.	"Invertigo"	2:53
6.	"Ala Moj Al Bahr"	7:29
7.	"Madlen"	6:36
8.	"Letters"	7:24
9.	"Laayounak"	9:26
10.	"Mulajia"	6:24
11.	"Mohammed"	5:29
12.	"Sin"	9:09
13.	"Just a Sec"	6:42
14.	"33.9 Million Miles"	6:52
15.	"Forgotten Stories"	4:16
Total length:		1:31:00

Masrahiya (2023)
No.	Title	Length
1.	"Roots (Prologue)"	4:52
2.	"The Chair (Chapter I)"	3:52
3.	"Al-Furat (feat. Metatext)"	3:55
4.	"The Visit (Chapter II)"	3:25
5.	"Diyafa"	5:26
6.	"Stranger"	6:49
7.	"The Cage (Chapter III)"	3:55
8.	"Set Free"	5:18
9.	"Qudud Halabiya"	3:20
10.	"Repeat (Epilogue)"	5:48
Total length:		46:00
