= Jaba', Jerusalem =

Jaba’
- Municipality type D (Village council)

Arabic transcription(s)
  - Arabic: جبع
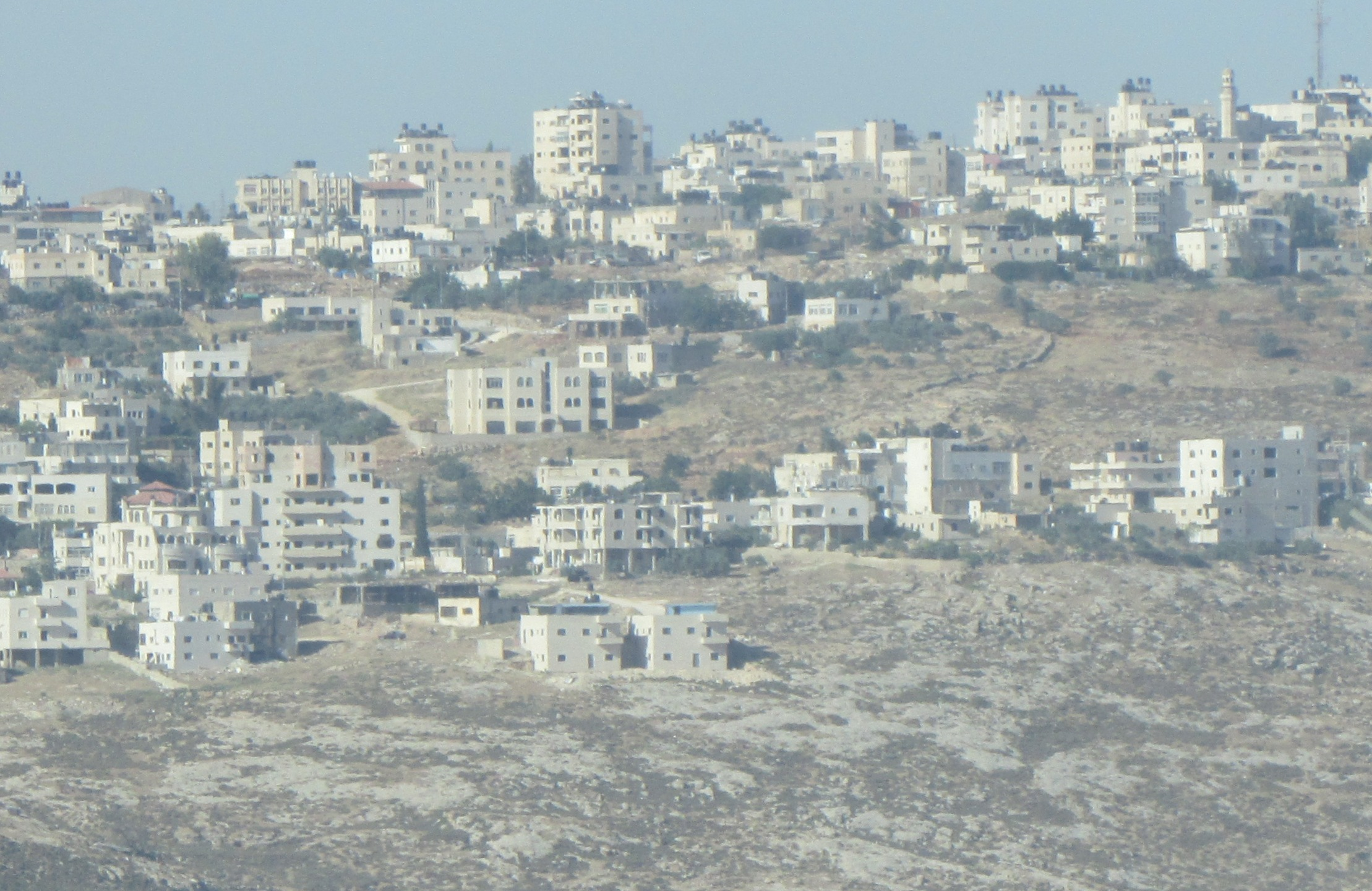
- Jaba', Jerusalem from the north

- Location of Jaba’ within Palestine
- Coordinates: 31°51′27″N 35°15′40″E
- Palestine grid: 174/140
- State: State of Palestine
- Governorate: Quds

Government
  - Type: Village council
- Elevation: 664 m (2,178 ft)

Population (2017)
  - Total: 3,921
- Name meaning: The hill

Jaba’ (Arabic: جبع) is a Palestinian town in the Jerusalem Governorate of the State of Palestine, located northeast of Jerusalem in the central West Bank. According to the Palestinian Central Bureau of Statistics, the town had a population of 3,921 in 2017.

== Location ==
Jaba' is located 9.12 kilometers (5.67 mi) north-west of Jerusalem. It is bordered by Mikhmas and 'Anata to the east, Mukhmas to the north, Al-Ram to the west, and Geva Binyamin, Hizma and 'Anata to the south.

== Toponymy ==
E. H. Palmer noted in 1881 that the name Jaba' might be derived from the Hebrew: גבעה, lit. 'hill'.

== History ==
Jaba' is securely identified with the ancient Geba of the tribe of Benjamin. Guérin, Clermont-Ganneau, and Conder & Kitchener of the PEF were among the first to suggest that identification during the 19th century. The identification is based on the biblical description of Geba as being just across the wadi from Michmash (present-day Mukhmas), and on archeological findings which show that the site was heavily populated during the Iron Age II and the Hellenistic period.

Ceramics from the Byzantine era have been also found in Jaba'.

=== Ottoman period ===
In 1517, the village was included in the Ottoman Empire with the rest of Palestine, and in the 1596 tax-records it appeared as [Jaba] al-Battih, located in the Nahiya of Quds of the Liwa of Al-Quds. The population was 51 households, all Muslim. They paid a fixed tax rate of 33.3% on agricultural products, such as wheat, barley, olive trees, fruit trees, goats and beehives, in addition to occasional revenues; a total of 9,442 akçe. 1/6 of the revenue went to a Muslim charitable endowment.

In 1838, it was a Muslim village, located in the area immediately north of Jerusalem. That year Robinson further noted it as a small village, and half in ruins. There were occasional large hewn stones, indicating antiquity. He also noted a small building, having the appearance of an ancient church, and a square tower. Robinson thought Jaba' was ancient Gibeah but most scholars today identify it with Tell el-Ful.

In 1863 Guérin noted: "Thirty of the houses only are standing. On the highest point of the plateau on which they are placed is a little fort or Burj, the lower courses of which, if they are not ancient, are at least built of ancient stones. Here and there cisterns and caves cut in the rock show the antiquity of the place. There is also an old wall of great square stones, only a few vestiges of which remain." An Ottoman village list from about 1870 found that the village had a population of 100, in a total of 35 houses, though the population count included only men.

Clermont-Ganneau, during his 1873 visit to the village, was informed by local residents that they originated from the region east of the Jordan. The village's shrine was dedicated to Neby Ya'kub, the biblical patriarch Jacob, who, as per local account, visited the village in the guise of an elderly man riding a white horse. Ganneau also documented a couple of their legends, one of which claimed that Jaba' was once the abode of Sultan esh-sh'hadeh, "the king of the profession of faith" or "king of martyrdom." Another legend, told by an old fellah who received it from his ancestors and Christians in Bethlehem, recounted a narrative akin to that of the Levite's Concubine.

In 1883, the PEF's Survey of Western Palestine (SWP) described it as "A village of moderate size standing on a rocky knoll. On the north is a deep valley (Wady Suweinit); on the south the ground falls less abruptly, but is very rocky; on the west the ridge is flat; and on the east is a plain extending for about 1 1/2 miles, and about 1/2 mile wide north and south. This plain is open arable land, extending to the brink of the precipitous cliffs on the north. The village has caves beneath, at the foot of the knoll [...] and there are olives on the west, north, and south. There is a central high house like a tower in the village.

They further noted: "There is a large cave beneath the village on the east, about 20 to 30 paces square, with a passage on the left at the back, extending 15 paces. This is partly cut, partly natural, with a double entrance. A second like it is said to exist nearer the village. West of the village, by the old road, are cisterns, rock-cut, and in one case roofed with a rubble tunnel-vault."

In 1896 the population of Dscheba was estimated to be about 204 persons.

=== British Mandate period ===
In the 1922 census of Palestine conducted by the British Mandate authorities, Juba had a population of 229, all Muslims, increasing in the 1931 census to 286 Muslim inhabitants, in 53 inhabited houses.

In the 1945 statistics Jaba had a population of 350 Muslims with 13,407 dunams of land, according to an official land and population survey. Of this, 282 dunams were plantations and irrigable land, 3,794 used for cereals, while 24 dunams were built-up (urban) land.

=== Jordanian period ===
In the wake of the 1948 Arab–Israeli War, and after the 1949 Armistice Agreements, Jaba' came under Jordanian rule.

The Jordanian census of 1961 found 415 inhabitants in Jaba'.

=== Post-1967 ===
After the Six-Day War in 1967, Jaba' came under Israeli occupation. The population in the 1967 census conducted by the Israeli authorities was 546, 8 of whom originated from the Israeli territory.

After the 1995 accords, about 5% of the village land was classified as Area B, the remaining 95% as Area C. Israel has confiscated village land for the construction of two Israeli settlements: 1,139 dunums for Giva’ Ben Yamin, 545 dunums for Shi’ar BenYamin, as well as for a military checkpoint, with additional land requisitioned for the Israeli West Bank barrier.

== Shrine of Nabi Yaqub ==
Within Jaba' is a shrine called Nabi Yaqub (نبي يعقوب, "prophet Jacob") or Sidna Yaqub (سيدنا يعقوب, "our lord Jacob"), which locals believe is the tomb of the patriarch Jacob, who, according to local tradition, used to appear sitting on a white female horse. This identification is solely local, as Islamic tradition generally identifies the tomb of Jacob in the Cave of the Patriarchs, in Hebron. The site believed to be Jacob's tomb is situated beneath the village's mosque, in a cave where locals show his tomb and claim it leads to Jerusalem. People from the area used to visit the site, make vows, and swear under the branches of the old olive tree located there.

== See also ==
- Muhareb Theeb

== Bibliography ==
- Barron, J. B., ed. (1923). Palestine: Report and General Abstracts of the Census of 1922. Government of Palestine.
- Ben-Arieh, Yehoshua (1985). "The Sanjak of Jerusalem in the 1870s" (PDF). Cathedra (in Hebrew). 36: 73–122. Archived from the original (PDF) on 2020-07-22.
- Conder, C.R.; Kitchener, H. H. (1883). The Survey of Western Palestine: Memoirs of the Topography, Orography, Hydrography, and Archaeology. Vol. 3. London: Committee of the Palestine Exploration Fund.
- Dauphin, C. (1998). La Palestine byzantine, Peuplement et Populations. BAR International Series 726 (in French). Vol. III : Catalogue. Oxford: Archeopress. ISBN 0-860549-05-4.
- Government of Jordan, Department of Statistics (1964). First Census of Population and Housing. Volume I: Final Tables; General Characteristics of the Population (PDF).
- Government of Palestine, Department of Statistics (1945). Village Statistics, April, 1945.
- Guérin, V. (1869). Description Géographique Historique et Archéologique de la Palestine (in French). Vol. 1: Judee, pt. 3. Paris: L'Imprimerie Nationale.
- Hadawi, S. (1970). Village Statistics of 1945: A Classification of Land and Area ownership in Palestine. Palestine Liberation Organization Research Center.
- Hartmann, M. (1883). "Die Ortschaftenliste des Liwa Jerusalem in dem türkischen Staatskalender für Syrien auf das Jahr 1288 der Flucht (1871)". Zeitschrift des Deutschen Palästina-Vereins. 6: 102–149.
- Hütteroth, W.-D.; Abdulfattah, K. (1977). Historical Geography of Palestine, Transjordan and Southern Syria in the Late 16th Century. Erlanger Geographische Arbeiten, Sonderband 5. Erlangen, Germany: Vorstand der Fränkischen Geographischen Gesellschaft. ISBN 3-920405-41-2.
- Mills, E., ed. (1932). Census of Palestine 1931. Population of Villages, Towns and Administrative Areas. Jerusalem: Government of Palestine.
- Palmer, E. H. (1881). The Survey of Western Palestine: Arabic and English Name Lists Collected During the Survey by Lieutenants Conder and Kitchener, R. E. Transliterated and Explained by E.H. Palmer. Committee of the Palestine Exploration Fund.
- Robinson, E.; Smith, E. (1841). Biblical Researches in Palestine, Mount Sinai and Arabia Petraea: A Journal of Travels in the year 1838. Vol. 2. Boston: Crocker & Brewster.
- Robinson, E.; Smith, E. (1841). Biblical Researches in Palestine, Mount Sinai and Arabia Petraea: A Journal of Travels in the year 1838. Vol. 3. Boston: Crocker & Brewster.
- Schick, C. (1896). "Zur Einwohnerzahl des Bezirks Jerusalem". Zeitschrift des Deutschen Palästina-Vereins. 19: 120–127.
- Socin, A. (1879). "Alphabetisches Verzeichniss von Ortschaften des Paschalik Jerusalem". Zeitschrift des Deutschen Palästina-Vereins. 2: 135–163.
- Toledano, E. (1984). "The Sanjaq of Jerusalem in the Sixteenth Century: Aspects of Topography and Population". Archivum Ottomanicum. 9: 279–319. Archived from the original on 2016-03-05.
