= Ahmad Manasra =

Palestinian imprisoned by Israel

- أحمد مناصرة
- Photo of Manasra during his incarnation
- Born: January 22, 2002 (age 24); Beit Hanina, Jerusalem
- Education: New Generation School
- Known for: Pisgat Ze'ev stabbings
- Criminal charges: 2 counts of attempted murder
- Criminal penalty: 12 years in prison (commuted to 9.5 years on appeal)
- Criminal status: Released

Ahmad Manasra (Arabic: أحمد مناصرة, romanized: Aḥmad Manāṣirah) is a Palestinian who was arrested in 2015 at the age of 13 for his role in the Pisgat Ze'ev stabbings committed in an Israeli settlement in East Jerusalem together with his cousin, Hassan, who was 15 years old and was killed during the attack. He was released on 10 April 2025, after spending 9 years in prison.

Manasra was born into a family of ten on 22 January 2002 in Beit Hanina, Jerusalem. At the time of his arrest, he was a student in the eighth grade at the New Generation School.

Manasra's case drew attention for the harshness of the sentence given his age, the use of solitary confinement during his detention, and the severe mental health impact of his custodial treatment. His case has also drawn strong international condemnation from human rights groups, which have raised concerns about the violations of international laws prohibiting torture and cruel, inhuman or degrading treatment, and have called for his early release. Amnesty International has consistently highlighted Manasra’s case as emblematic of the systemic human rights violations faced by Palestinian children within the Israeli military justice system.

== Arrest and trial ==
In 2016, after the Pisgat Ze'ev stabbings, Ahmad Manasra was convicted of attempted murder and sentenced to 9.5 years in prison, he was also fined 180,000 shekels. He was initially sentenced to 12 years, but after his lawyer's appeal, the sentence was reduced by 3,5 years. During the stabbing, his cousin, Hassan, critically wounded a 13-year-old Israeli boy who was leaving a candy store and stabbed an Israeli man. Police released security camera footage of the Manasra and Hassan wielding knives and chasing a man through the streets of Pisgat Ze’ev on the morning of October 13, 2015.

Hassan was shot dead by police, while Ahmad was run over by a car and shouted by passers by. The video of Ahmad lying in the street and bleeding from his head went viral on the internet, accumulating millions of views. Another video that was aired on Palestinian television, showed him being interrogated by police officers. The video showed an interrogating officer screaming at him and attempting to intimidate him to confess, while Manasra, was replying to him that he was unable to remember anything and that he needed to be taken to a doctor. He did not have a lawyer or parent present during his interrogation.

In court, Manasra was not found to have been directly involved in the stabbings, but he was still convicted despite being below the minimum age of criminal responsibility.

== Imprisonment ==
During his time in prison, Manasra has been subjected to serious violations of his rights, including enduring insults, threats, and harsh treatment. He has also suffered from solitary confinement, which has significantly impacted his mental health, leading to diagnoses of schizophrenia, psychosis, severe depression, and suicidal thoughts.

Israeli authorities moved Manasra into solitary confinement in 2021 due to a fight between him and other inmate. His family and lawyers claim that he remained locked in his cell for all but an hour of each day and that he developed paranoia and delusions. He later tried to slit his own wrists in a suicide attempt. Manasra was given injections of medication each month to keep him stable. A physician diagnosed him with schizophrenia when he was 18 and said that it was caused by the stress of being in prison.

Manasra's treatment in prison has been characterized by inhumane conditions, prolonged isolation, and a lack of proper medical care, raising concerns about violations of international law regarding torture and cruel, inhuman, or degrading treatment. European Union and the United Nations both repeatedly called for his release, but the Israeli Supreme Court ruled that, as a convicted terrorist, he was ineligible for parole despite his age and mental health issues.

== Release from prison ==
On April 10, 2025, Manasra was released from Israeli prison after completing his 9.5 year sentence. He and his family will continue to face restrictions, including restrictions on their ability to talk to the media, despite his release. According to Manasra's family, the Israeli authorities summoned and interrogated him on the same day he was released for unknown reasons.

He was expected to be released at Nafha prison, where his family was waiting to pick him up, but they were later informed that he was released in the city of Beersheba, approximately 50 kilometres away from the prison. Manasra was left alone in an empty area before being found by a stranger who contacted his family, allowing them to find him.

== International response ==
The international response to the case of Manasra has been marked by strong condemnation and calls for his immediate release. Human rights experts and organizations, including the UN, as well as numerous mental health groups, have urged Israel to free Manasra due to the serious violations of his rights and the inhumane treatment he has endured.

UN human rights experts have criticized Israel for Manasra's detention, highlighting that it violates international humanitarian law and that his imprisonment has deprived him of his childhood and essential rights.They emphasized the urgent need for Manasra to receive necessary mental health care and counseling, especially considering his deteriorating condition.

Amnesty International has condemned the solitary confinement of Manasra as a violation of the absolute prohibition on torture and other cruel, inhuman, or degrading treatment. Amnesty's reports have also highlighted Manasra's case as part of a broader pattern of discrimination against Palestinian children in the Israeli criminal justice system, underscoring the need for fair trials and an end to ill-treatment.
