= Qubur Bani Isra'il =

Archaeological site in West Bank, State of Palestine

Qubur Bene Isra'in
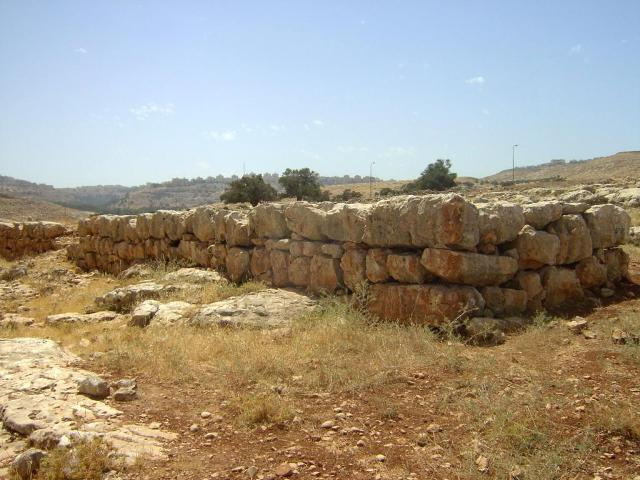

- Location within the West Bank
- 31.842250°N 35.268950°E
- Type: Tomb
- Location: West Bank, Palestine

Site notes
- Material: Local stone

Qubur Bene Isra'in or Qubur Bani Isra'il (lit. "Tombs of the Children of Israel"), are four, formerly five, huge stone structures dated to the Middle Bronze Age, which rise from a rocky plateau overlooking Wadi Qelt in the West Bank, about 3.5 miles northeast of Jerusalem, between Hizma and Geva Binyamin along Highway 437.

== History ==
Clermont-Ganneau, followed by Macalister, identified the site with the tomb of the biblical matriarch Rachel based on the biblical text (1 Samuel 10:2). It can be hypothesised from the name Qaber Um Bene Israin, "Tombs of the Mothers of the Sons of Israel", that this is the tomb of Rachel (see 1 Samuel 10), or that there is a connection to the death and burial of the nurse Deborah "below Bethel" from Genesis 35:8, as well as to the passage about the oak of Tabor being near Rachel's tomb in 1 Samuel 10.

The Israel Antiquities Authority survey gives the site the identification code Hizma, site number 480 in Benjamin, coordinates 17580 and 13880. Archaeological evidence shows that the site was occupied during the Middle Bronze Age. Excavation work was executed by Tzur Abeles, who published the results in 1997.

There were originally five structures, but one was demolished in the late 1980s to make way for the Ramallah bypass road.

Louis-Hugues Vincent researched the site and found five very large stone structures, between 10 and 53 metres long and 2.8-6.62 metres high, each with a funerary room in its centre. The rough-hewn stone blocks form rectangular walled structures. Vincent studied the building style and drew the conclusion that they were erected by Bronze Age nomadic shepherds, who would bring their dead back here and bury them inside the structures.

When Vincent asked local inhabitants for the name of the site, they said Qubbur Bene Israin, "Tombs of the Sons of Israel". They called the largest structure Qaber Um Bene Israin, "Tomb of the Mother of the Sons of Israel".

== See also ==
- Hiking in Israel
- Israeli archaeology
