= Pisgat Ze'ev stabbings =

2015 stabbing attack in Israel

- Part of Palestinian political violence
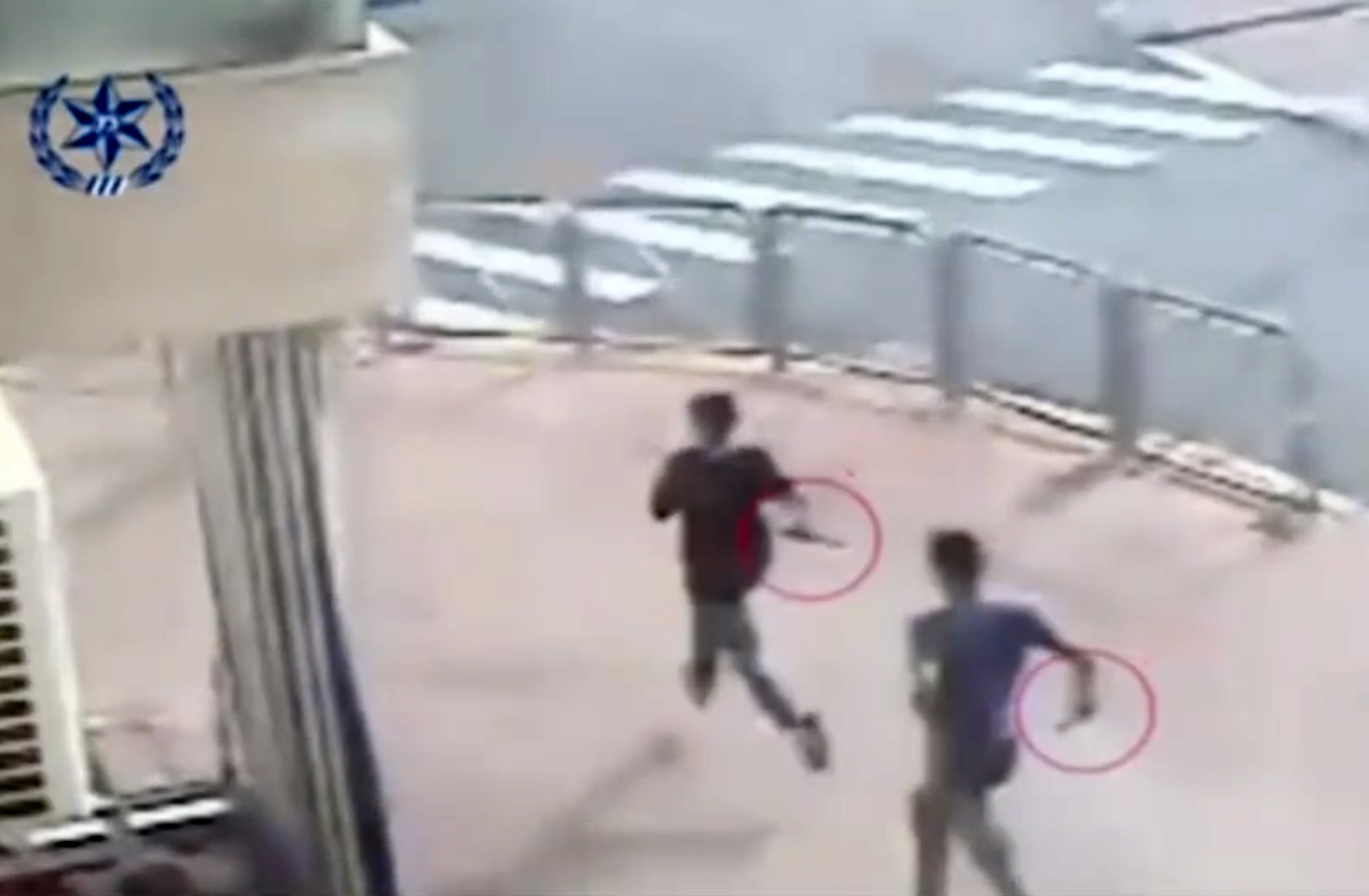
- CCTV footage of the attack
- Location: Pisgat Ze'ev, East Jerusalem
- Date: October 12, 2015; 11 years ago
- Target: Jews
- Attack type: Stabbing
- Weapon: Knives
- Deaths: 1 (assailant)
- Injuries: 2 victims, 1 assailant
- Assailants: Hassan and Ahmad Manasra
- Verdict: 12 years in prison

On October 12, 2015, two Palestinian boys, 15-year-old Hassan Khalid Manasra and his cousin 13-year-old Ahmad Manasra, both from Beit Hanina, stabbed two Israeli civilians in Pisgat Ze'ev, an Israeli settlement in East Jerusalem. The victims were 20-year-old Yosef Ben-Shalom, a security guard, and Naor Shalev Ben-Ezra, a 13-year-old boy. Hassan was shot dead by a police officer while Ahmad was struck by a car. The attack attracted significant attention among both Israelis and Palestinians because of the young age of the attackers.

A clip from the aftermath of the attack showed Ahmad injured on the road, while people shout at him until the ambulance arrives; the video spread on social media. Israeli police released CCTV footage on October 14, 2015, showing Hassan and Ahmed Manasra with knives and engaging in the attack, to refute allegations of unwarranted targeting by authorities.

Ahmad Manasra was tried and convicted on two counts of attempted murder, receiving an initial sentence of 12 years, later reduced to 9 and a half years by the Israeli Supreme Court.

== Attack ==
According to security camera footage of the attack, it went as follows:

Hassan and Ahmed equipped themselves with knives. In Pisgat Ze'ev, they found Yosef Ben-Shalom, a 20-year-old male security guard who they chased after with their knives drawn, and stabbed. The guard fled, and they instead turned their attention to some nearby shops. Outside of a candy shop, they found Naor Shalev Ben-Ezra, a 13-year-old boy on a bicycle, who they stabbed. The boy sustained critical injuries. Another angle from the security camera footage shows Hassan running across a street.

Hassan was subsequently shot and killed, reportedly while advancing towards police with a knife in his hand.

Ahmad tried to escape the area, but was struck by a pursuing car and suffered serious head injuries.

== Victims ==
Naor Shalev Ben-Ezra, the 13-year-old boy from Jerusalem, survived the attack, after had been critically injured by the cousins while he was riding his bike. The knife had pierced his subclavian artery, causing severe bleeding that field medics struggled to control. Initially presumed dead upon arrival at Mount Scopus, the Hadassah medical team, led by Dr. Yoachim Shiffman, identified signs of life. Dr. Shiffman manually controlled the bleeding by inserting his fingers into the artery for 15 minutes. Vascular surgeon Ina Akopnick, racing against time, performed a crucial operation to close the truncated artery, aided by Professor Achmed Eid, Director of General Surgery at Hadassah Medical Center, who opened the chest cavity for the procedure. His gradual awakening in intensive care marked the beginning of his recovery journey.

Ben-Ezra's recovery was marked by significant celebration, attended by family, friends, Deputy Mayor of Jerusalem Meir Turgeman, media reporters, and David Dalfon, the first medical responder who played a crucial role in saving Ben-Ezra's life. After recovering physically from the stabbing attack, Ben-Ezra faced significant emotional and psychological struggles. Despite a fastest physical recovery, Naor felt isolated and misunderstood. He described feeling emotionally dead, saying, "You are not treated, you are dead." This emotional turmoil led to a rapid decline in his well-being. Naor began using drugs, gambling, accruing debts at a young age, and generally struggling to function. Over time, however, he managed to return to a more stable life.

The adult victim, Yosef Ben-Shalom, also suffered serious injuries, including damage to the lung and liver.

== Video coverage ==
A viral video of the attack spread on social media. The two minute-long clip showed Ahmad laying on the street of Pisgat Ze'ev after being struck by a car. His legs were twisted behind him, and blood was coming out of his head as bystanders filmed using cell phones. A crowd surrounds him and shouts, "Die, son of a bitch" along other profanities in Hebrew. After about a minute, an ambulance arrives.

On October 14, 2015, Israeli police released CCTV footage from the incident, showing Hassan and Ahmed Manasra armed with knives and chasing a man. The video further depicted one of the attackers charging at a police officer before being shot. This release aimed to counter claims that the teenagers were targeted by authorities without cause.

== Responses ==
Abbas reacted strongly to the attack. On October 15, he gave a televised speech translated to English by The Jerusalem Post in which he lambasted the "Israeli aggression" and called for the "immediate positive interference by the international community before it is too late." He reiterated that the Palestinian side would not accept any changes to the "status quo" for the Temple Mount. He also mentioned "the execution of our children in cold blood as they did with the child Ahmed Manasra and other children from Jerusalem." In an English translation of Abbas' speech released by the PLO Abbas was quoted as saying Israel "shoots" Palestinian children "as they did with the child Ahmed Manasra," replacing the word "executions" with more moderate language.

The speech was heavily criticized by the Israeli side for its inflammatory language and because Ahmed was still alive.

Dr. Asher Salmon, the deputy director of the Hadassah Medical Center in Jerusalem where Ahmed was treated, said that the boy was still alive and was in light-to-moderate condition. Photos of Manasra from the hospital were released to support his statements.

== Trial of Ahmad ==
Ahmad was indicted by the Jerusalem District Court on two counts of attempted murder and detained in a closed facility in the Galilee in northern Israel.

The defense argued that Ahmad did not physically carry out the stabbings, but that Hassan had, a claim contested by the prosecution. The judges noted that the accused had sought to stab any Jewish person they encountered and did not hesitate to attack a young boy near his home. Ahmad expressed regret for his actions during the trial, particularly concerning the harm to the young boy.

On November 8, 2015 a ten-minute long video was leaked to the media showing Israeli interrogators shouting at the visibly distressed Ahmad. The video shows him confessing to the crime which he later would recant. According to Brad Parker of the Defence for Children International - Palestine the video provided evidence of a violation of international juvenile standards found in the UN Convention on the Rights of the Child. He further claimed that the situation in the video might have amounted to torture.

Prosecutor Yuval Kedar said that it was irrelevant that Ahmad was a minor and that he should be prosecuted "to the fullest extent of the law."

In December 2015, Tareq Barghout, an Arab Israeli lawyer on Manasra's defense team, was arrested on suspicion of praising attackers and encouraging further attacks on Facebook. The court released Barghout and noted that the material was poorly translated from Arabic to Hebrew and that he had freedom of expression. Later in 2019, Barghout was convicted and sentenced to 13.5 years in prison for his involvement in several shooting attacks against Israelis in the West Bank, in collaboration with Zakaria Zubeidi.

In May 2016, Ahmad was convicted on two counts of attempted murder, though no blood was found on the knife found in his possession, and he was sentenced to 12 years in prison. His legal counsel, the Israeli attorney Lea Tsemel, called the conviction "surprising, unbalanced and problematic." She argued that it was Hassan that carried out the stabbings and that neither boy intended to kill anyone, that they "just wanted to scare Jews so they’d stop killing Palestinians."

Naor Ben-Ezra, the young victim, expressed disappointment that Manasra did not receive a life sentence, a sentiment echoed by his father, Shai, who lamented the impact of the attack on his son's adolescence and family life.

In August 2017, the Israeli Supreme Court reduced his sentence to 9 and a half years in prison. The court upheld the compensation Ahmed should pay to the two victims; NIS 100,000 to the 13-year-old boy and NIS 80,000 to the 20-year-old security guard.

== The "Youth bill" ==
In response to Hassan and Ahmad Manasra's attack and similar attacks carried out by Palestinian children against Israelis during the 2015–2016 wave of violence in the Israeli-Palestinian conflict, the Israeli parliament, the Knesset, in August 2016 passed the "Youth bill." The bill allowed Israeli authorities to imprison children from the age of twelve if convicted of "terrorism." Knesset member Anat Berko who introduced the bill said "A society is allowed to protect itself. To those who are murdered with a knife in the heart it does not matter if the child is 12 or 15." Israeli human rights group B'Tselem condemned the bill.

== See also ==
- List of violent incidents in the Israeli–Palestinian conflict, 2015#October
- 2015–2016 wave of violence in Israeli-Palestinian conflict
