= Simcha Holtzberg =

Israeli activist and Holocaust survivor

- שמחה הולצברג
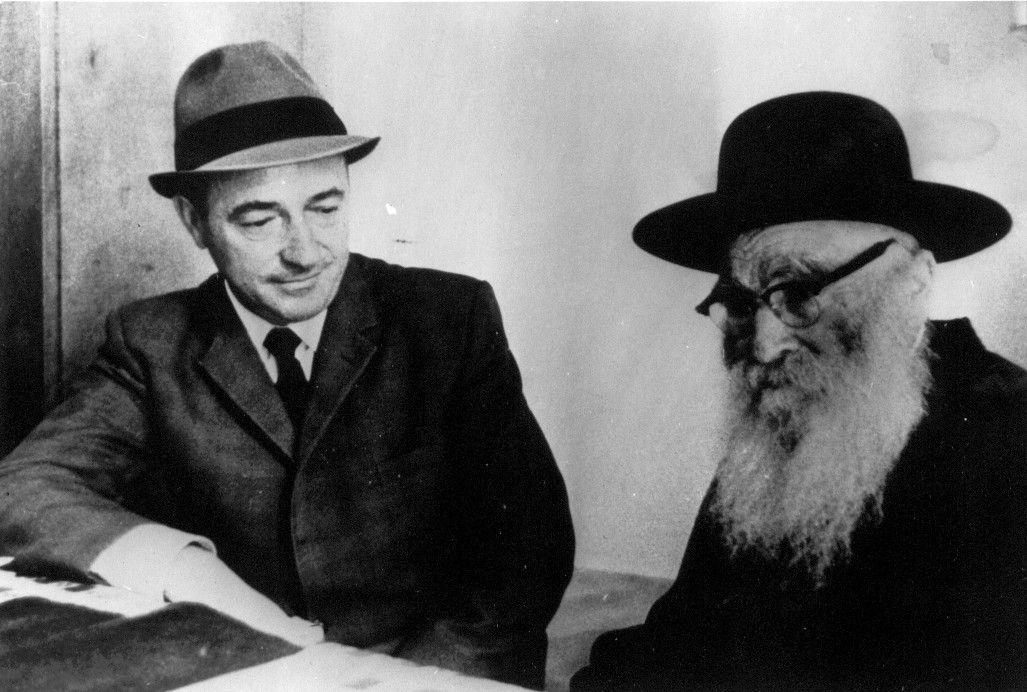
- Simcha Holtzberg (left) with Rabbi Aryeh Levin
- Born: April 18, 1924; Warsaw, Poland
- Died: February 13, 1994 (aged 69); Israel
- Resting place: Sanhedria Cemetery, Jerusalem
- Other name: "Father of the Wounded Soldiers"
- Occupation: Activist
- Known for: Advocacy for wounded soldiers and Holocaust survivors
- Honors: Israel Prize (1976); Commemorative stamp by Israel Philatelic Federation; Streets named in his honor across Israel

Simcha Holtzberg (sometimes spelled Holzberg) (Hebrew: שמחה הולצברג; April 18, 1924 – February 13, 1994) was an Israeli activist and Holocaust survivor. He was known as the "Father of the Wounded Soldiers," and was a recipient of the Israel Prize.

== Biography ==
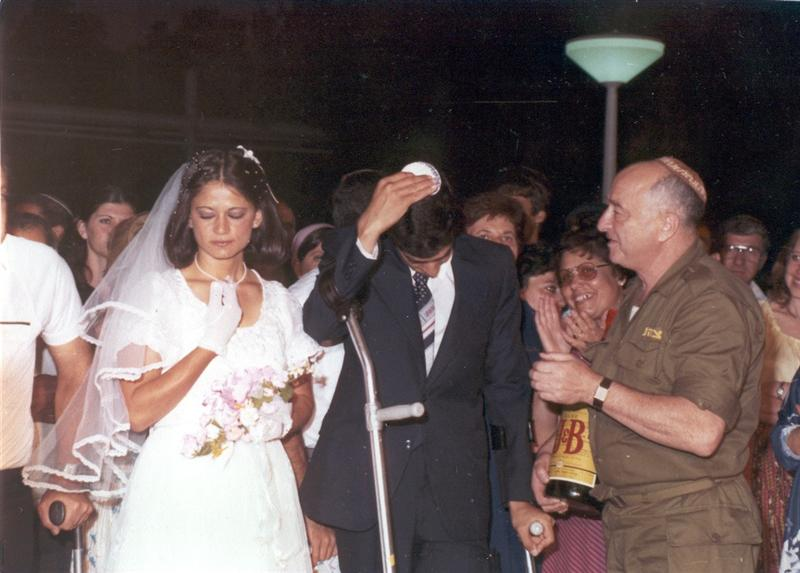
Simcha Holtzberg (right) attends the wedding of a wounded soldier.

Holtzberg was born in Warsaw, Poland, to Shmuel and Tziporah Holtzberg. He participated in the Warsaw Ghetto Uprising, was captured by the Nazis and sent to different concentration camps, and was liberated from Bergen-Belsen.

Holtzberg arrived in Israel in 1949, and became famous for his stubborn struggle against normalizing relations between Israel and Germany. He organized demonstrations every time a high-ranking German official came to Israel.

He also established Holocaust libraries and published the poems of the Holocaust poet Itzhak Katzenelson. He befriended the famous Rabbi Aryeh Levin of Jerusalem, known as "Father of the Prisoners". Levine's example influenced Holtzberg's lifetime devotion to wounded soldiers, whom he considered "the nation's holy and righteous".

Holtzberg became known in Israel as "Father of the Wounded Soldiers". He dedicated his life to visiting and helping wounded-in-service soldiers and terrorism victims in Israel. His aim was to restore the wounded to normal lives and enable them to return to society successfully.

In 1976, Holtzberg was awarded the Israel Prize, for his special contribution to society and the State of Israel.

== Death ==
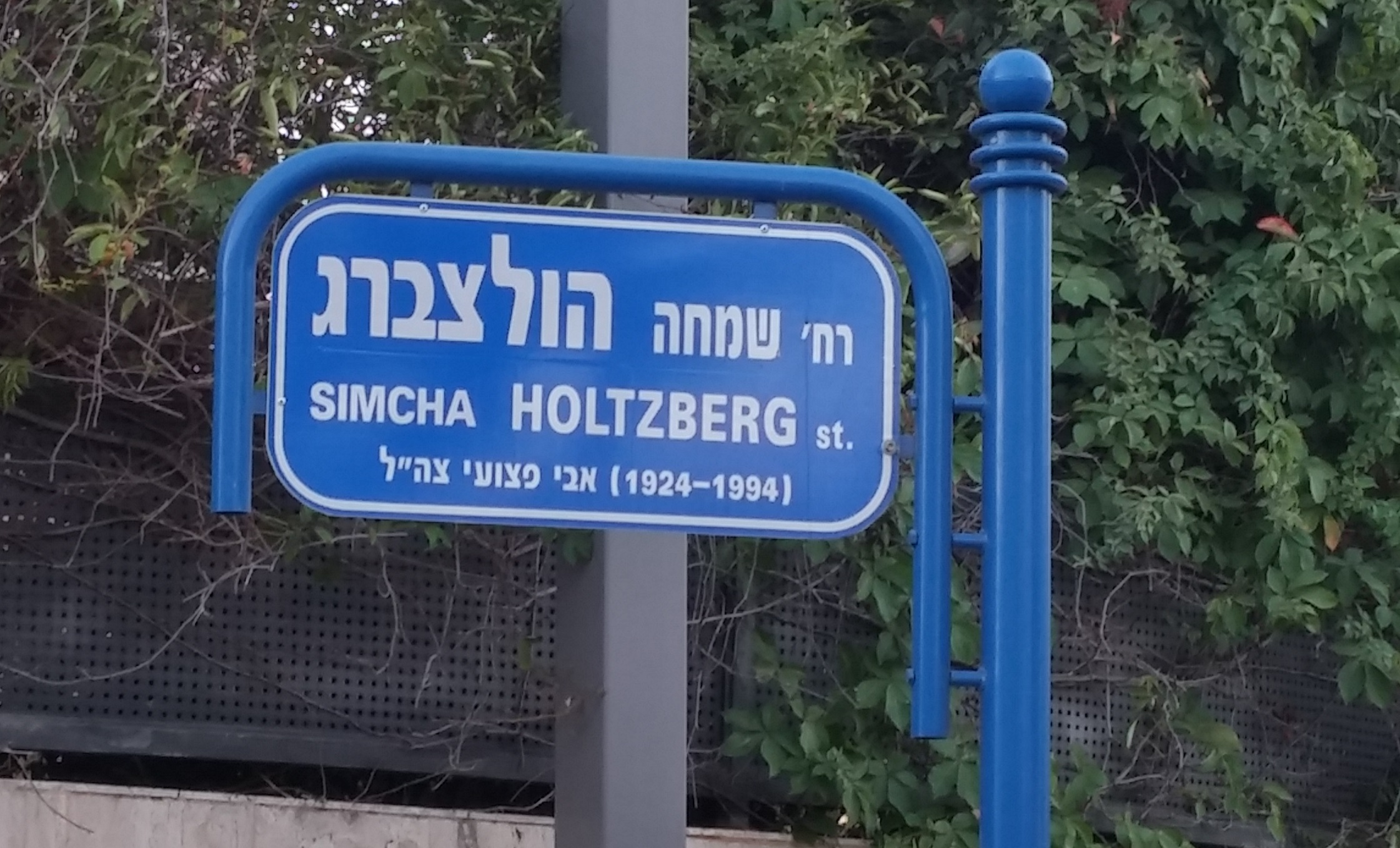
Simcha Holtzberg street, Herzliya

Holtzberg died during a ceremony held in honor of the wounded on February 13, 1994. He is buried in the Sanhedria Cemetery in Jerusalem.

The Israel Philatelic Federation issued a stamp in his honor on April 19, 1999, the 75th anniversary of his birth, showing his portrait and a legend stating "Father of the Wounded Soldiers". Dozens of streets in Israel are named in his honor, including one in Pisgat Ze'ev, Jerusalem.

== Media ==
- Documentary Film made by IDF Spokesman: part 1 on YouTube part 2 on YouTube.
- Film about Holtzberg and the young girl who were injured during the Gulf War.

== See also ==
- List of Israel Prize recipients
