= Geva Binyamin =

Israeli settlement in the West Bank

Geva Binyamin: גֶּבַע בִּנְיָמִין (Hebrew)
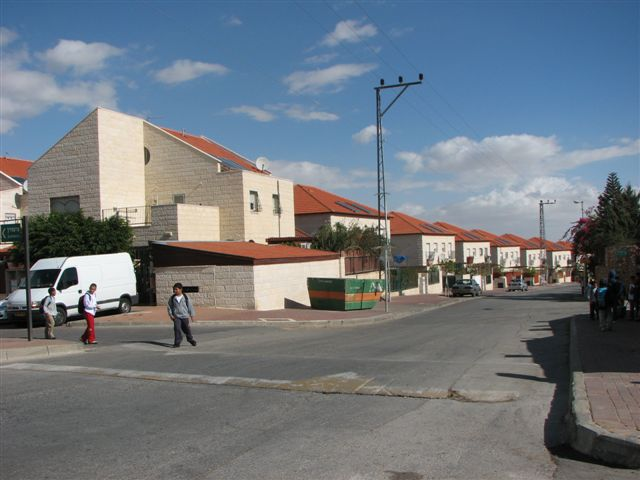

- Location within the Central West Bank
- Coordinates: 31°51′0″N 35°16′26″E
- Country: Palestine
- District: Judea and Samaria Area
- Council: Mateh Binyamin
- Region: West Bank
- Founded: 1984
- Founder: Adam gar'in members
- Population (2024): 5,901
- Website: www.geva-binyamin.org.il

Geva Binyamin (Hebrew: גֶּבַע בִּנְיָמִין, lit. 'Benjamin Hill'), also known as Adam (Hebrew: אדם), is an Israeli settlement in the West Bank, built over land expropriated from the Palestinian village of Jaba'. It is organised as a community settlement and falls under the jurisdiction of Mateh Binyamin Regional Council. In 2024, it had a population of 5,901.

The international community considers Israeli settlements in the West Bank illegal under international law, but the Israeli government disputes this.

== Etymology ==
The name Geva Binyamin comes from an eponymous Biblical site – Geba of Benjamin – which is believed to have stood around the same location. According to contemporary scholarship, Geba of Benjamin was located in the nearby village of Jaba', which preserves the biblical name.

== History ==
According to ARIJ, Israel confiscated 1,139 dunams of land from the Palestinian village of Jaba' in order to construct Geva Binyamin. Some Jaba' residents have reportedly managed to return to part of their land fenced off by the settlers of Geva Binyamin.

The village was established in 1984 by members of the Adam gar'in (named after Yekutiel Adam, a former Deputy Chief of Staff of the Israeli Defence Forces who had been killed two years earlier in Lebanon).

Qubur Bani Isra'il is located on the outskirts of the settlement.

When Migron, the largest Israeli outpost in the West Bank, was found to be illegal and furthermore, established largely on private Palestinian land, the mandatory evacuation plan foresaw, as a compromise with the affected settlers, a major expansion of Geva Binyamin in order ostensibly to house the Mignon evacuees. However, the announced expansion of Geva Binyamin spoke of the construction of 1,400 housing units, notwithstanding the fact that the Migron settlement to be abolished had only 50 family units.

Plans have been advanced to expand Jewish settlement northwards from Neve Ya'akov towards Geva Binyamin in order to create a seamless continuity between Jewish communities in this area of the West Bank, and it is thought the main purpose is block the urban expansion of Al-Ram and Hizma, something which would leave the settlement isolated.

== Voting Patterns ==
In the 2022 election, 88 percent of voters in Geva Binyamin voted for the parties of the right-wing coalition led by Benjamin Netanyahu, while 9 percent voted for the parties of the center-left coalition led by Yair Lapid. The Arab parties did not receive any votes.

In the 2026 election, 86 percent of voters in Geva Binyamin voted for the parties of the right-wing coalition led by Benjamin Netanyahu, while 9 percent voted for the parties of the center-left coalition led by Gadi Eisenkot and 0.03 percent voted for the Arab parties. An additional 2.4 percent voted for the Reservists, and 2 percent voted for Amcha Yisrael. Voter turnout increased 19 percent from the 2022 election.
