= Pisgat Ze'ev =

Israeli settlement in East Jerusalem

Coordinates: 31°49′30″N 35°14′30″E

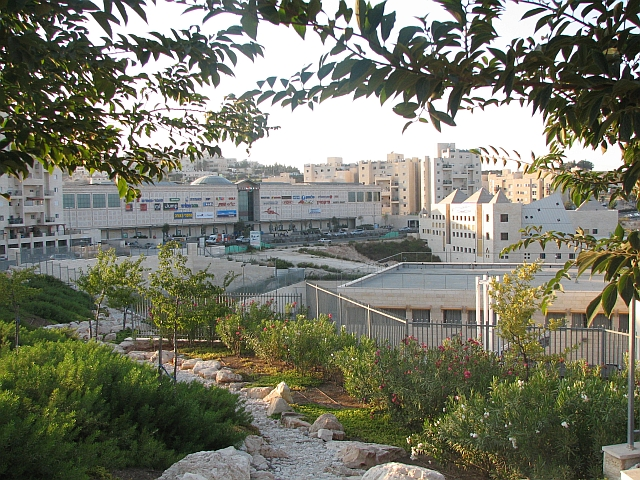
View of Pisgat Ze'ev Mall (left) and Community Center (right foreground) on Moshe Dayan Boulevard

Map showing Pisgat Ze'ev and other Jewish (in blue) and Arab (in green) localities in East Jerusalem and the West Bank; the 1949 armistice line is in green, the boundary of East Jerusalem in red, and the pre-1967 border of the East Jerusalem Municipality in brown.

Pisgat Ze'ev (Hebrew: פסגת זאב, lit. Ze'ev's Peak) is an Israeli settlement in East Jerusalem and the largest residential neighborhood in Jerusalem with a population of over 50,000. Pisgat Ze'ev was established by Israel as one of the city's five Ring Neighborhoods on land effectively annexed after the 1967 Six-Day War.

The international community considers Israeli settlements in East Jerusalem illegal under international law, but the Israeli government disputes this.

Pisgat Ze'ev is situated east of Shuafat and Beit Hanina, west of Hizma, south of Neve Yaakov, and north of 'Anata and the Shuafat refugee camp. The Israeli West Bank barrier includes Pisgat Ze'ev in the northern section of Jerusalem while excluding Shuafat refugee camp from the city by running in an S-shape here.

== History ==
=== Antiquity ===
Archeological evidence shows that in the biblical period, the site encompassed small agricultural villages along routes north from Jerusalem to Nablus and the Galilee. The villages made use of varied water-catchment strategies and served the needs of Israelite Jerusalem, including as a major producer of wine and oil for use in the Temple in Jerusalem. Three ritual baths from the Second Temple period have been excavated in Pisgat Ze'ev.

The Byzantine period saw the villages' primary use shift from agriculture to service religious functions, such as churches and monasteries. A large monastery from the period was located at the site's highest point, Ras at-Tawill. The monastery was likely active from the end of the 5th century to the close of the 8th century, and included a mosaic-floored chapel above a burial cave, as well as an oil press and a cloth bag of 200 coins. An oven and pots from the Iron Age were also found nearby.

An archaeological site known as Deir Ghazali (the Deer Monastery) was also excavated in eastern Pisgat Ze’ev.

Overlooking the neighborhood is Tell el-Ful, believed to be the capital of the Tribe of Judah and site of the Israelite King Saul's palace. King Hussein of Jordan began constructing a palace there in the mid-1960s.

=== Modern era ===
In the 1930s, plots of land were purchased near Hizme by European Jews for the establishment of a Jewish farming cooperative, Havatzelet Binyamin. Most of the landowners died in the Holocaust. The land was later expropriated along with Palestinian land to build Pisgat Ze'ev.

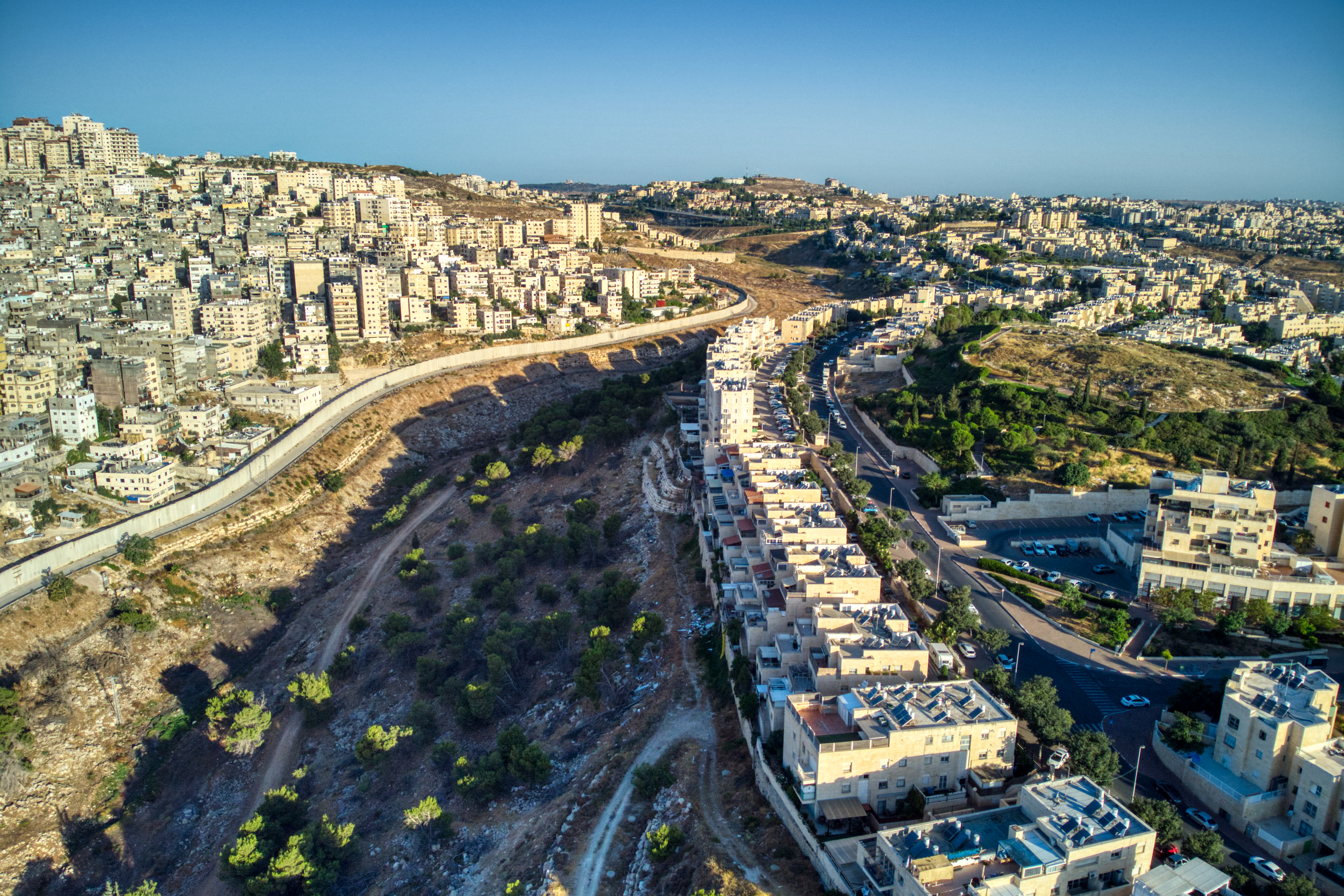
Pisgat Ze'ev facing the Shu'fat Palestinian refugee camp, bordered by the Israeli West Bank barrier, 2023

Pisgat Ze'ev was established in 1982 on land annexed to Israel after the 1967 Six-Day War as one of the city's five Ring Neighborhoods, meant to create a contiguous Jewish link with Neve Yaakov in the city's north, which had been isolated from other Jewish areas. The original name proposal was "Pisgat Tal," based on the Arabic name of the hilltop where construction was to begin, Ras at-Tawill, but the final choice was Pisgat Ze'ev, after the Revisionist Zionist leader, Ze'ev Jabotinsky.

According to ARIJ, Israel confiscated land from several surrounding Palestinian communities in order to construct Pisgat Ze'ev:

- 1,458 dunams from Beit Hanina,
- 686 dunams from Beit Hanina for the Pisgat Amir neighbourhood in Pisgat Ze'ev,
- 239 dunams from Shuafat,
- 89 dunams from Hizma.

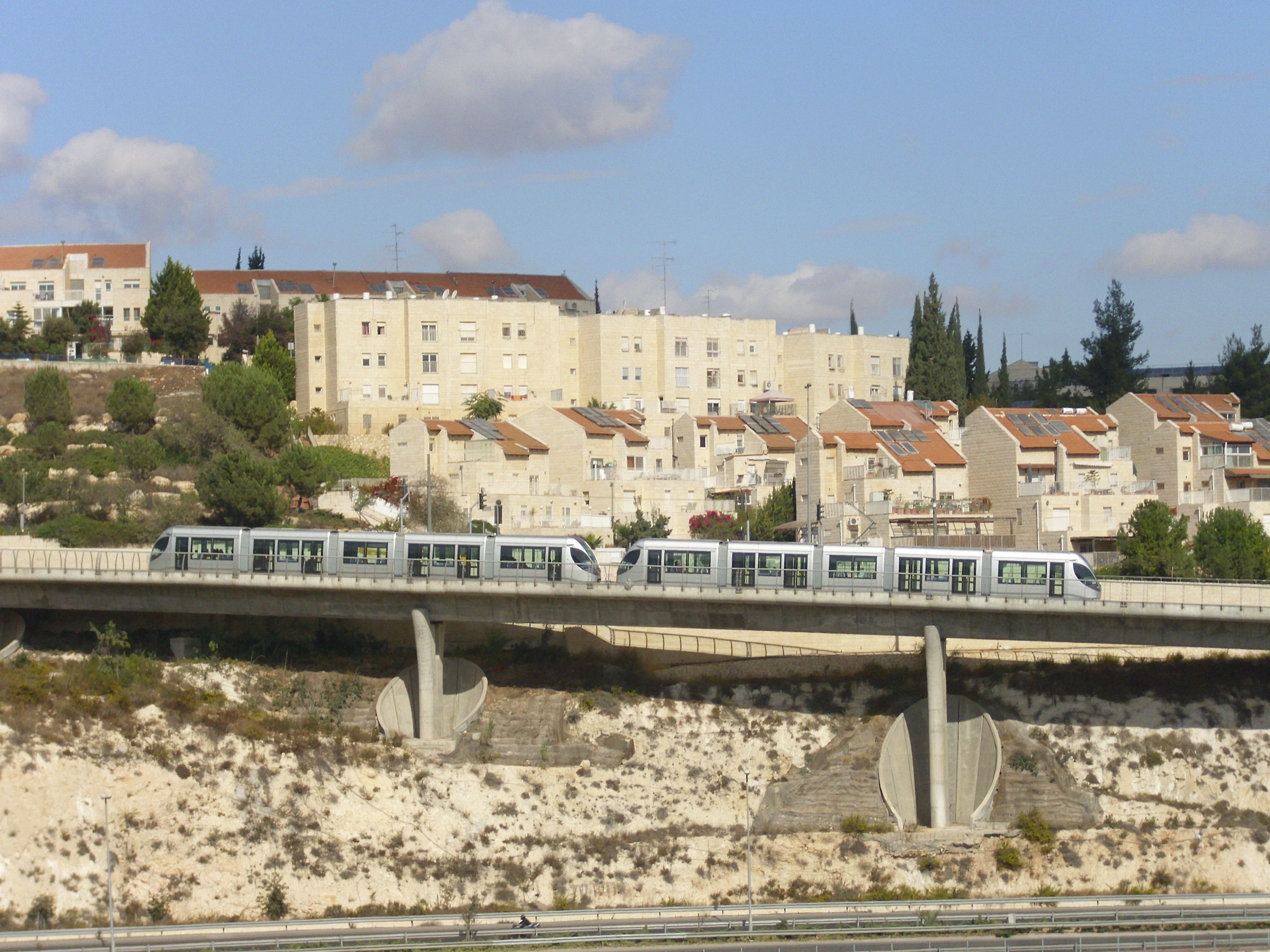
Jerusalem Light Rail running through Pisgat Ze'ev

In May 2003, a public bus leaving the Pisgat Ze'ev terminus was blown up by a Palestinian suicide bomber. Seven people were killed in the attack and dozens were wounded. The police said the bomber boarded the bus disguised as a religious Jew, wearing a kippa and a prayer shawl. One of the victims was a resident of the Shuafat refugee camp, on his way to work at the Hadassah Medical Center in Ein Kerem.

== Geography ==
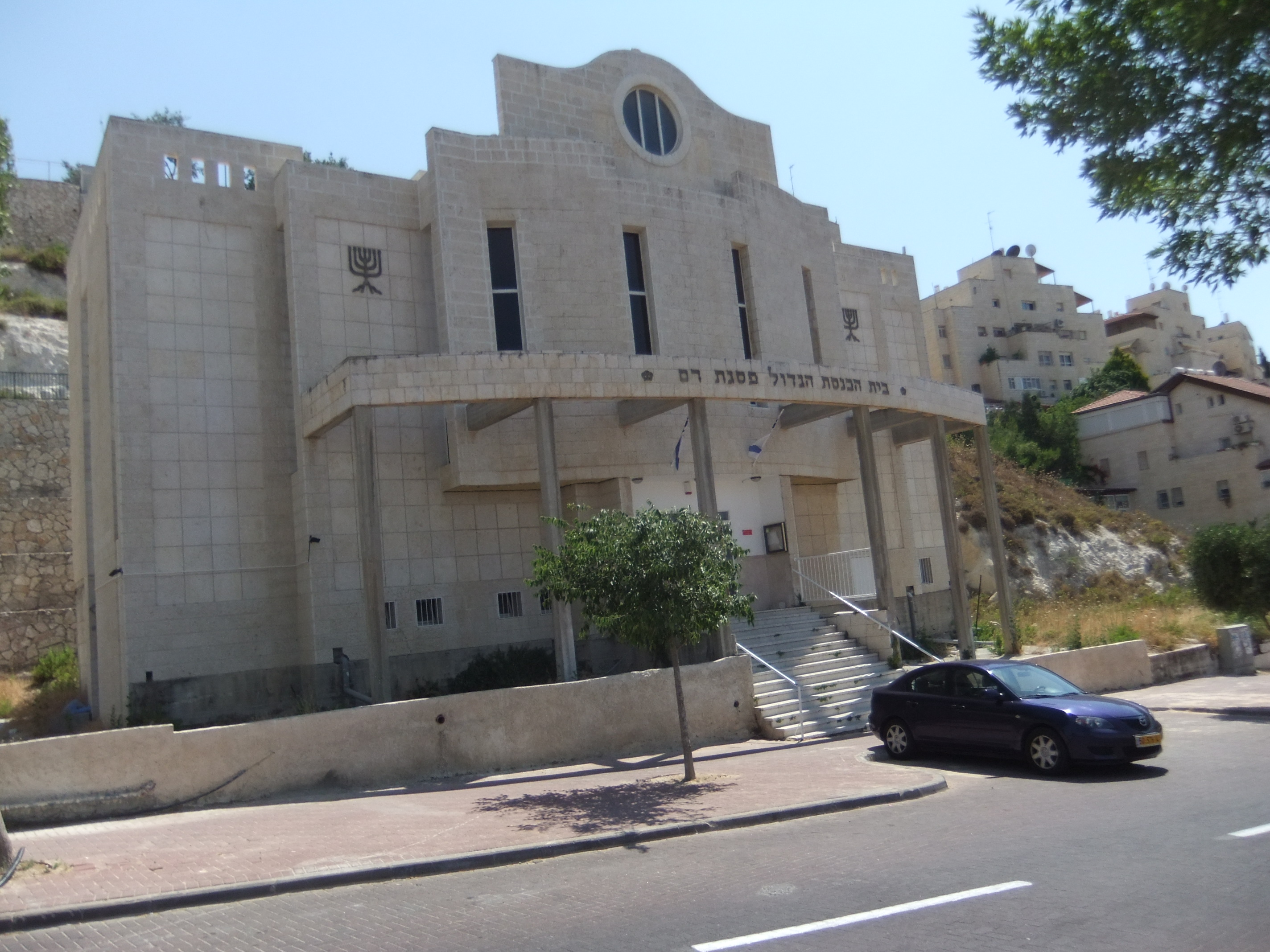
Great Synagogue, Pisgat Ze'ev

The neighborhood was established on a hilltop known in Arabic as Ras at-Tawill, 772 meters above sea level, and its additional construction phases descend along the ridge and up to a neighboring hill. Pisgat Ze'ev has five districts: Center (1984), West (1988), East and North (1990), and South (1998). Pisgat Ze'ev is situated in north Jerusalem to the east of Shuafat and Beit Hanina, west of Hizma, south of Neve Yaakov, and north of French Hill, 'Anata and the Shuafat refugee camp. It is due east of the watershed on the edge of the Judean Desert.

== Demographics ==
In 2017, Pisgat Zeev had a population of 42,300. In 2007 it was reported to have about 1,300 of which were Arabs. Many residents of Pisgat Ze'ev are Jerusalem families that left the city center in search of more affordable housing. Pisgat Ze'ev has a mixed population of religious and secular Jews. The construction of the Israeli West Bank barrier has also prompted Arabs to move to Pisgat Ze'ev.

== Status under international law ==
The international community considers Israeli settlements in the Israeli-occupied territories, including East Jerusalem, to violate the Fourth Geneva Convention's prohibition on the transfer of a civilian population into occupied territory and thus illegal under international law, but the Israeli government disputes this. Israel disputes that the Fourth Geneva Convention applies to these territories as they had not been legally held by a sovereign prior to Israel taking control of them. This view has been rejected by the International Court of Justice and the International Committee of the Red Cross.

== Schools and public buildings ==
With 40 percent of the residents under the age of 21, Pisgat Ze'ev has 58 kindergartens, 9 elementary schools, 2 middle schools and 3 high schools. There are also 22 synagogues and 2 libraries.

== Transportation ==
Moshe Dayan Boulevard, beginning at Highway 1 (Israel/Palestine) in the south and ending in Neve Yaakov in the north, is named after the famed Israeli Army general. It is Pisgat Ze'ev's major commercial thoroughfare, including many shops, eateries and the Pisga Mall.

Pisgat Ze'ev is located on the Jerusalem Light Rail line. Pisgat Ze'ev Center is two stations away from the northern terminus.

Many of the street names in Pisgat Ze'ev commemorate leading Israeli personalities such as Simcha Holtzberg, Moshe Rachmilewitz, Eliyahu Meridor and Meir Gershon. In the center of Pisgat Ze'ev, many streets are named for Israel Defense Forces units that fought in the country's wars such as Sayeret Duchifat Blvd., HaSayeret HaYerushalmit St., Sayeret Golani St. and Hel HaAvir St. A memorial for fallen soldiers is located in an archeological park in central Pisgat Ze'ev.

=== Street names ===
Moshe Dayan Boulevard, beginning at Highway 1 (Israel/Palestine) in the south and ending in Neve Yaakov in the north, is named after the famed Israeli Army general. It is Pisgat Ze'ev's major commercial thoroughfare, including many shops, eateries and the Pisga Mall. Many of the street names in Pisgat Ze'ev commemorate leading Israeli personalities such as Simcha Holtzberg, Moshe Rachmilewitz, Eliyahu Meridor and Meir Gershon. In the center of Pisgat Ze'ev, many streets are named for Israel Defense Forces units that fought in the country's wars such as Sayeret Duchifat Blvd., HaSayeret HaYerushalmit St., Sayeret Golani St. and Hel HaAvir St. A memorial for fallen soldiers is located in an archeological park in central Pisgat Ze'ev.

== Environmental projects ==
With the help of the Society for the Protection of Nature in Israel (SPNI), the residents of Pisgat Ze'ev transformed a 5-acre (20,000 m^{2}) site used as an illegal dumping ground into a wildflower sanctuary with over 55 species of trees and plants.

In 2011, an innovative water-recycling project was introduced at the ritual bath in Pisgat Ze'ev which will make it unnecessary to change the water every day. In 2011, rainwater collection tanks were installed at the Pisgat Ze'ev (West) school in a project designed to conserve water organized by the Green Network, which specializes in educational programming in ecology and the environment.

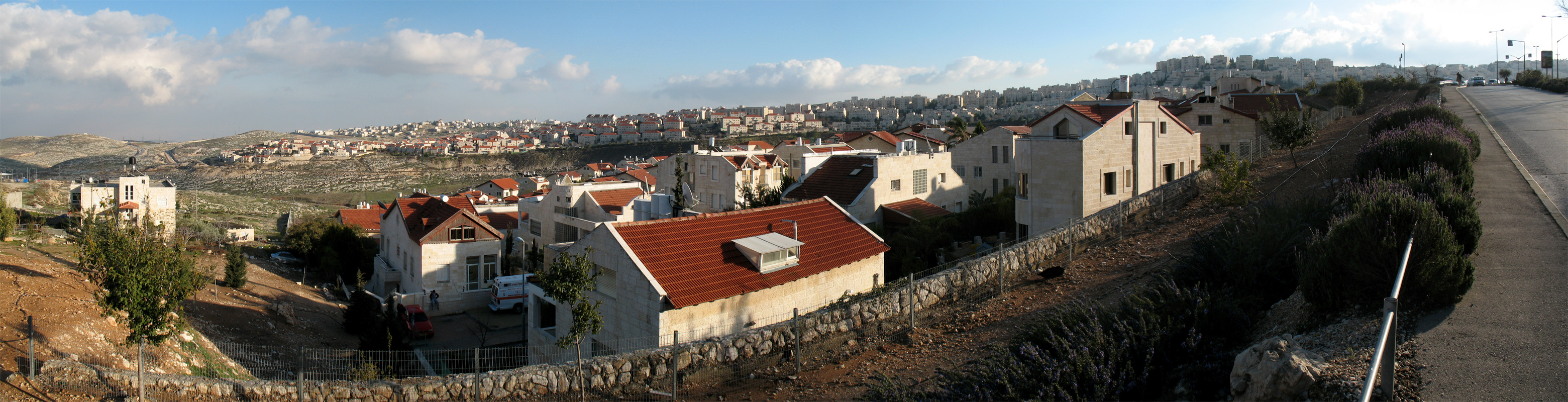
Pisgat Ze'ev East

== See also ==
- List of places in Jerusalem
- Kubur Bani Yisra’il
- Pisgat Ze'ev stabbings
- Royal Palace, Tell el-Ful
