= Royal Palace, Tell el-Ful =

Coordinates: 31°49′23.74″N 35°13′51.82″E

- Hussein's Palace
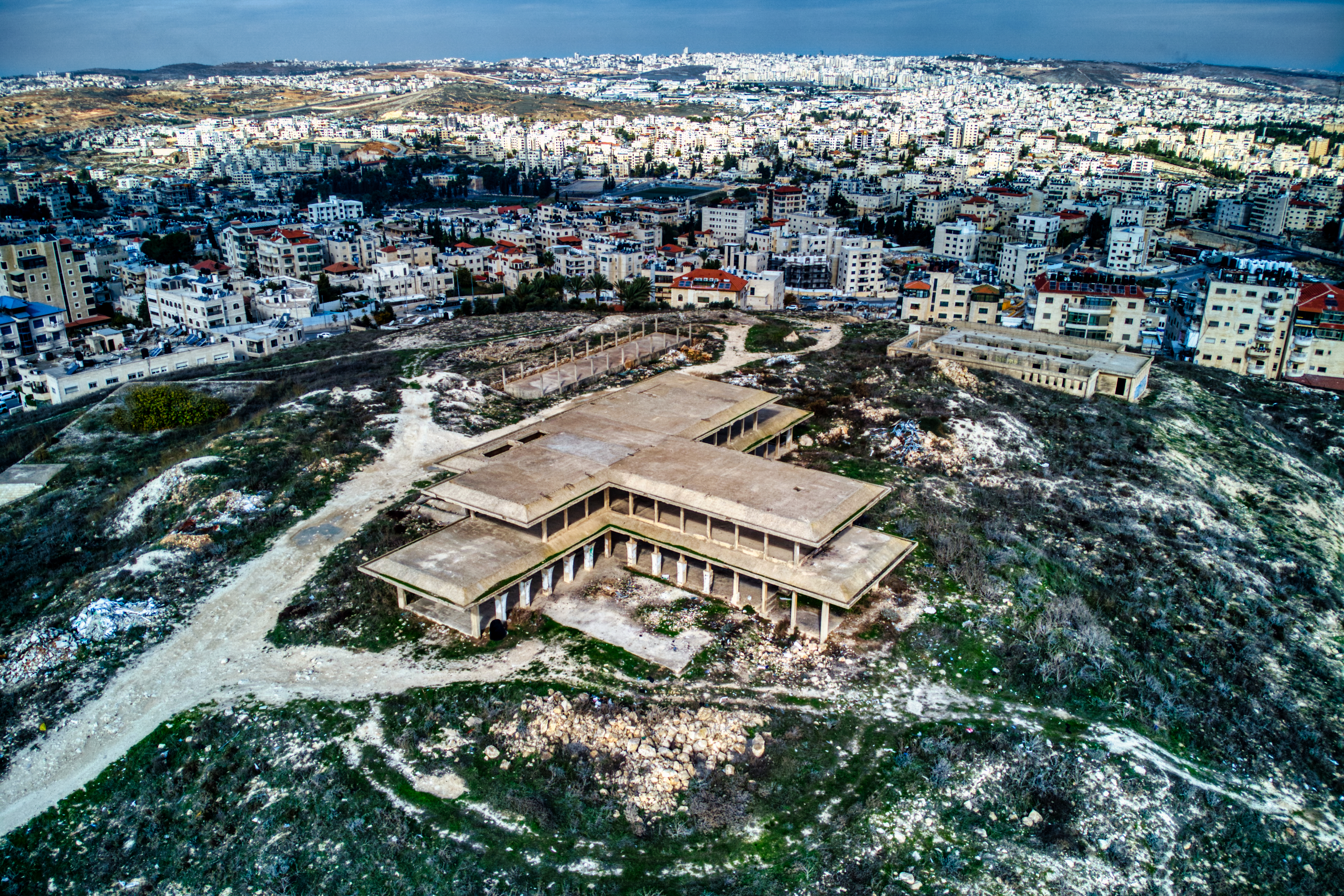
- Interactive map of the Royal Palace, Tell el-Ful area

General information
- Location: Beit Hanina, Jerusalem
- Construction started: 1965
- Completed: unfinished
- Client: King Hussein of Jordan

Royal Palace at Tell el-ful is an abandoned structure near Beit Hanina, atop a hill known as Tell el-Ful (Hill of Beans, Hebrew: גבעת שאול, Givat Shaul, lit. Hill of Saul).

== History ==
The hill of Tell el-Ful, located just west of Pisgat Ze'ev and overlooking the Arab neighborhood of Shuafat, is 2,754 feet (839 m) above sea level, making it one of the highest summits in the vicinity.

The structure was intended to be a summer residence for King Hussein of Jordan, whose grandfather, Abdullah I, occupied Jerusalem and the rest of the West Bank, annexing the territory after the 1948 Arab–Israeli War. Construction started in the mid-1960s, in reaction to the locating of the residence of Israel's president in West Jerusalem. As the official holiday retreat of the Jordanian royal family, it was to be an architectural masterpiece that would host dignitaries from around the world. The design envisaged a grandiose structure consisting of three levels, interconnected with arches plated with Jerusalem stone.

Construction came to a halt after the 1967 War, when Israel captured the area. The structure was still a building site and was left uncompleted. Still owned by the Hashemite Kingdom, it remains today as found in 1967: a skeletal, two-storey cement structure. By 2010, it had become a haven for drug users; a local official said at the time that attempting to redevelop the building and end the neglect would potentially "raise a storm in Jordan." In August 2011, the Jerusalem municipality stopped unauthorised workers who had erected a fence around the site. The Jerusalem Waqf denied that Jordan was preparing to renovate the palace.

== Archaeology ==
The identification of tell el-Ful with biblical Gibeah, the capital of King Saul, is generally accepted and ruins of a fortress are apparent at the site. Due to the site's archaeological significance, a number of digs have occurred at the site, the first in 1868. Jordanian plans to build the royal palace atop the mound prompted a third excavation in 1964 which attempted to salvage and document the findings prior to construction work.
