= Muhareb Theeb =

- محارب ذيب
- Born: 1914; Jaba', Jerusalem
- Died: 1995 (aged 80–81)
- Other name: Abu Suleiman
- Occupations: Tribal judge, folk poet
- Known for: Palestinian folk poetry and rababa performance

Muhareb Theeb (Arabic: محارب ذيب; 1914–1995), also known as Abu Suleiman (Arabic: أبو سليمان), was a Palestinian tribal judge and folk poet. He was regarded as one of the prominent figures of Palestinian folklore and traditional music. He was also known as the "Poet of the Rababa" and the "Poet of Palestine".

== Early life ==
Muhareb Theeb was born in the village of Jaba', Jerusalem, in the Jerusalem District, in 1914. He died in 1995. He was raised by his father, Sheikh Theeb Nassar, who was a community mediator, tribal judge, and poet in the areas of Jerusalem and Ramallah.

== Artistic career ==
Muhareb Theeb learned to play the rababa and to improvise poetry through imitation and practice when he was twelve years old. He became known for his skill in playing the traditional rababa while performing Palestinian folk poetry, including Ataba and Mawwal. His performances combined instrumental music with improvised and narrative poetry. His poetry has been described as an epic record of the history of the Palestinian people. His poems followed political developments and emphasized Palestinian national identity, attachment to the land, and the importance of preserving it. Wisdom and social values were also recurring themes in his poetry.

== Legacy ==
Muhareb Theeb is remembered as a prominent Palestinian folk poet and rababa performer. His work contributed to the preservation of Palestinian oral traditions and musical heritage, particularly through the combination of rababa performance and folk poetry.

== See also ==
- Palestinian folklore
- Music of Palestine
- Palestinian literature
- Rababa
- Mawwal
- Jaba', Jerusalem
