= Moshe Rachmilewitz =

Israeli physician (1898–1985)

Moshe Rachmilevitz משה רחמילביץ
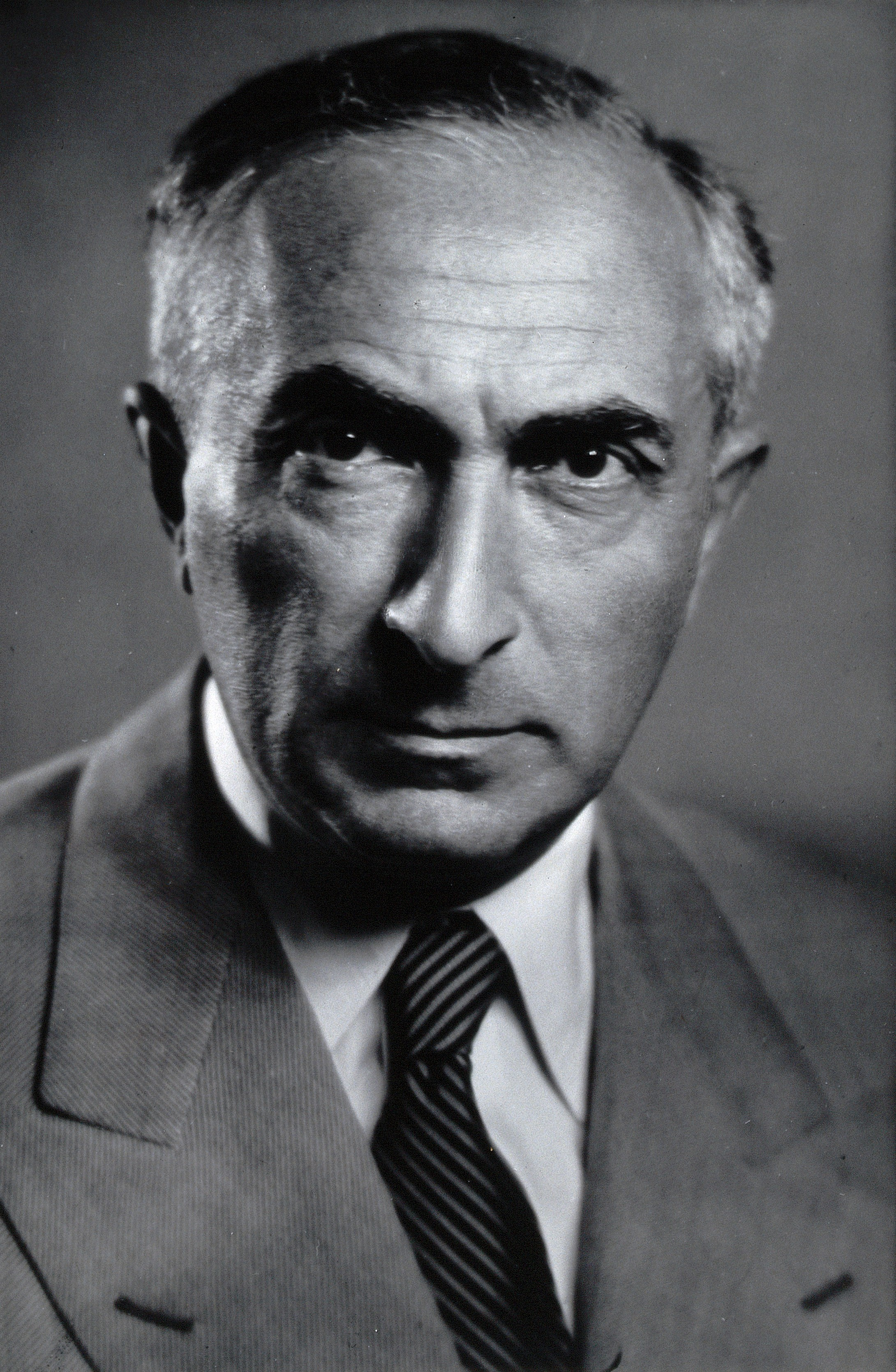
- Born: 1898; Mstislavl, Belarus
- Died: 1985 (aged 86–87); Israel
- Spouse: Rechavia Rachmilewitz
- Awards: Israel Prize (1964)
- Scientific career
- Fields: doctor

Moshe Rachmilevitz (Hebrew: משה רחמילביץ; 1898–1985) was an Israeli doctor and was one of the fathers of professional medicine in Israel.

== Biography ==
Rachmilewitz was born to a Jewish family in 1898 in Mstislavl (now in Belarus), then part of the Russian Empire, and grew up in the city of Babruysk. His parents were Eliezer Lipman Rachmilewitz and Dvosha Zack. After completing high school, he studied medicine in Germany.

In 1926, he immigrated to Mandate Palestine and began working at Bikur Holim Hospital in Jerusalem. In 1927, he was chosen to go to the United States for further training, and specialized at the Mount Sinai Hospital in New York. Following his return from the United States, he worked at Jerusalem's Hadassah Hospital on Mount Scopus. In 1949, following the evacuation of the Mount Scopus facility as a result of it being cut off by Arab forces, he moved with the hospital to temporary facilities before moving in 1961 to the new Hadassah Hospital in Ein Kerem, in southwest Jerusalem.

Rachmilewitz was the personal physician to many of Israel's leaders. He was among the first heads of medical school at the Hebrew University of Jerusalem, serving as dean of the faculty from 1958 to 1961.

Rachmilewitz's principal area of research and specialization was blood diseases.

He was married to Chava (née Pomerantz) and had two sons, Daniel and Eliezer, both of whom are professors of medicine. He died in 1985 of colon cancer.

Upon his death, a street in Jerusalem was named “Rachmilewitz Street”.

== Awards and honours ==
- In 1964, Rachmilewitz was awarded the Israel Prize, in medicine.
- In 1970, he received the award of Yakir Yerushalayim (Worthy Citizen of Jerusalem) from the city of Jerusalem.
- Rachmilewitz Street in Pisgat Ze'ev, in northeast Jerusalem, is named after him.

== See also ==
- List of Israel Prize recipients
