= Mawwal =

Arabic genre of vocal music

In Arabic Music, the mawwāl (Arabic: موال; plural: mawāwīl, مواويـل) is a traditional and popular Arabic genre of vocal music that is very slow in beat and sentimental in nature, and is characterised by prolonging vowel syllables, emotional vocals, and is usually presented before the actual song begins. The singer performing a mawwal would usually lament and long for something, such as a past lover, a departed family member or a place, in a wailing manner.

== Etymology ==
Mawwal is an Arabic word that means "affiliated with", "associated with," or "connected to". The verb is waala (وَالَى). It is measure 3 of the root verb "Walia" (وَلِيَ), which means to follow, be affiliated with, support, or sponsor. Originally the verbal noun has a Yaa in the definite form but it loses it when the word is indefinite.

== History ==
There are many preferences regarding the origin of the mawwal, one of these is the one al-Suyuti attributes it in the book Sharh al-Muwashah to the era of Harun al-Rashid. When he insisted on his concubines to eulogize his minister, Jaafar al-Barmaki, after his brutality against him, then a concubine named al-Mawlia, from which "mawwal" is derived, was the one who eulogized him.

Another preference is Safi al-Din al-Hilli in his book al-Mawwal al-Baghdadi in which he attribute it to the people of Wasit in Iraq. Also, Safi al-Din al-Hilli says that the mawal is from the simple sea sounding on the base of the wide sea, and the mawal continued in this way until the eighth century AH, when the mawwal appeared using the Iraqi dialect of the vernacular and the subsequent branching of the mawal in the eleventh century into three other types, namely The quatrain and The lame and Numani.

== Egypt ==
In Egypt, which is considered one of the traditional homes Mawwawel ("plural of Mawwal") the musicians of Mawawil play the rabab (a double-stringed spike fiddle made from half of a coconut shell covered with fish skin and a bow strung with horse hair), the kawala (an end-blown, oblique flute with six holes) and the arghoul (an ancient double clarinet characterized by two pipes of unequal length. The second pipe serves as a drone and can be lengthened by adding pieces. The player uses the technique of circular breathing to produce an uninterrupted sound). The arghoul can be traced back to Pharaonic times as it is exactly depicted on wall paintings of the temples of the third dynasty. Amin Shahin is one of the few remaining arghoul players in Egypt, since the death of arghoul master, Moustafa Abd al Aziz in 2001.

== Mesopotamia ==
Santur
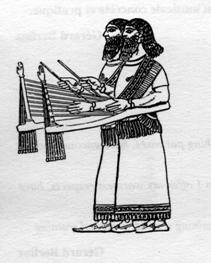
- The archetype of the instrument carried horizontally and struck with two sticks, found in iconographical documents in ancient Babylon (1600-911 BCE) and Neo-Assyria (911-612 BCE).

String instrument
- Classification: Struck

Related instruments
- Qanun

The mawwal musicians in Iraq use mainly santur, which is a hammered dulcimer of Mesopotamian origin, (trapezoid box zither with a walnut body and 92 steel [or bronze] strings. The strings, tuned to the same pitch in groups of four, are struck with two wooden mallets called "midhrab"), joza, and oud, as the country's oud playing tradition have become an own school and a reference. It is illustrated specially by the figure of the acclaimed Munir Bashir.

Due to geographical proximity to the Arab world, Assyrian musicians may also implement Mawwal in their work. Albert Rowel Tamras and Adwar Mousa, who are from Iraq and Syria, respectively, are such examples who use this art form in their music. In many forms of Assyrian music, Mawwal is performed as an intro for an upbeat song, such as those in the rhythm of bagiyeh/peda.

== Lebanon ==
Mawwal is sung by powerful singers who are able to demonstrate strong vocal capabilities. The most famous singers come from Lebanon in specific, Sabah, Wadih El Safi and Fairouz. Nowadays, some of the most famous and strongest singers that can sing mawaweels are Najwa Karam and Wael Kfoury.

== See also ==
- Rawda Khwani
- Muwashshah
- Andalusian classical music
- Malhun
- Qasida
- Rubaiyat
- Mizrahi music, a Jewish genre of music that makes use of the mawwal.
- Muhareb Theeb
