= Hizma =

- Municipality type C

Arabic transcription(s)
  - Arabic: حزما
  - Latin: Hizme (official)
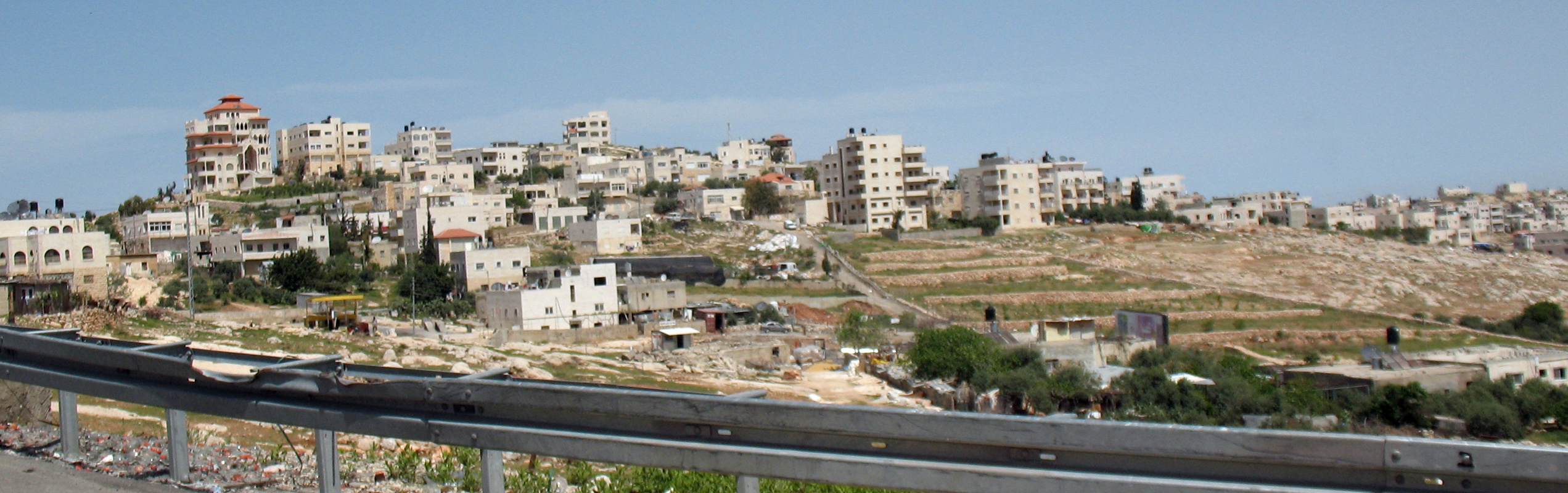
- Hizma

- Location of Hizma within Palestine
- Coordinates: 31°50′06″N 35°15′43″E
- Palestine grid: 175/138
- State: State of Palestine
- Governorate: Quds

Government
  - Type: Municipality

Area
  - Total: 4.6 km^{2} (1.8 sq mi)

Population (2017)
  - Total: 7,118
  - Density: 1,500/km^{2} (4,000/sq mi)
- Name meaning: "The bundle"

Hizma (Arabic: حزما) is a Palestinian town in the Jerusalem Governorate, seven kilometers from Jerusalem's Old City. The town, mostly located in Area C of the West Bank, borders four Israeli settlements, Neve Yaakov and Pisgat Ze'ev (both officially considered part of Jerusalem), Geva Binyamin and Almon.

Hizma is identified with the biblical town of Azmaveth of the Israelite tribe of Benjamin. Archaeological findings confirm a Jewish presence during Roman times, marked by a thriving stoneware industry, and the discovery of a burial cave housing ossuaries inscribed in the Hebrew alphabet. Byzantine period ceramics were also found at the site. Throughout Ottoman, British, and Jordanian rule, Hizma was a small village inhabited by Muslims.

Since 1967, Hizma has been occupied by Israel. The village is cut off from Jerusalem by the Israeli West Bank barrier in the west and from the West Bank by settlements in the east. As of 2017, Hizma had a population of about 7,118 residents.

== History ==
=== Iron Age ===
In the 1920s, Albright suggested that Hizma was identical with the biblical town of (Beth) Azmaveth of the Israelite tribe of Benjamin (see Ezra 2:24; Neh. 7:28, 12:29).

Gibson, after surveying the village in 1981, questioned this identification, citing the lack of archaeological remains from the necessary time period. However, another survey conducted two years later by Uri Dinur yielded Iron Age II pottery.

Dinur and Feig found sherds from Iron Age II, Persian and Hellenistic period. Based on the findings, Finkelstein asserts that Hizma can be positively identified with Azmaveth.

=== Roman period ===
Stone vessels made of chalkstone (a type of soft limestone) are typical for and unique to Jewish sites from the time between the second half of the first century BCE and the Bar Kokhba revolt (132–135 CE), frequently found in Judea, Transjordan, Galilee and the Golan, with Hizma being one of the few identified quarrying and production sites. Towards the end of the Roman period, there was an industry in Hizma producing fine stoneware from the local limestone. Products included vases and bowls turned on a lathe, and mugs carved by hand. Examples of stoneware that may have originated here have been found in many places in the Jerusalem region, mostly dating from the first and second centuries CE.

A burial cave from the first centuries BCE and CE was found in Hizmeh in 1931. Six ossuaries were present, two of which had inscriptions, which bear the names Hoshea and Mariam in Hebrew and Aramaic using the Jewish script. In 1983, an ancient Jewish ossuary said to be from Hizma appeared in the Jerusalem antiquities market and was acquired by the Department of Antiquities. This ossuary is inscribed in Aramaic, indicating it belonged to "Yehoḥanah, Granddaughter of the High Priest Theophillus". Josephus, the historian, references a high priest of the same name, appointed by Vitellius in the brief period before he was informed of Tiberius' death, approximately around 37 AD.

=== Byzantine period ===
Ceramics from the Byzantine period have also been found at Hizma.

=== Ottoman period ===
In 1517, the village was incorporated into the Ottoman Empire with the rest of Palestine, and in the 1596 tax-records it appeared as Hamza, located in the Nahiye of Jerusalem in the Sanjak of the Mutasarrifate of Jerusalem. The population was 28 households, all Muslim according to census records. They paid a tax rate of 33,3% on agricultural products, which included wheat, barley, vineyards and fruit trees, occasional revenues, goats and beehives; a total of 2800 akçe. (Note: Toledano, 1984, p. 293, gives the location of Hizma as 35°15′40″E 31°50′15″N)

In 1838, Edward Robinson found the village had been deserted for two months, as the villagers had "fled across the Jordan" to escape conscription. He further noted it as a Muslim village, located in the immediate vicinity of Jerusalem.

In 1863 Victor Guérin found the village to have 200 inhabitants. He further noted that some of the houses, particularly the lower part, seemed to be built from ancient materials, and some cisterns also looked ancient.

An Ottoman village list of about 1870 showed 51 houses and a population of 150, though the population count included only the men. In 1883, the PEF's Survey of Western Palestine (SWP) described Hizma as a "small stone village, standing high on a prominent hill, the slopes of which are covered with olives. It has a well to the west."

In 1896 the population of Hizma was estimated to be about 192 persons.

=== British Mandate ===
In the 1922 census of Palestine, conducted by the British Mandate authorities, Hizma had a population of 515 Muslims, increasing slightly in the 1931 census to 521 Muslims in 91 inhabited houses.

In the 1945 statistics the population of Hizma was 750 Muslims, and the total land area was 10,438 dunams of land according to an official land and population survey. Of this, 200 dunams were plantations and irrigable land, 2,338 for cereals, while 45 dunams were built-up (urban) land.

=== Jordanian period (1948-1967) ===
In the wake of the 1948 Arab–Israeli War, and after the 1949 Armistice Agreements, Hizma came under Jordania rule.

In 1961, the population of Hizme was 1,134.

=== Israeli occupation (since 1967) ===
Since the Six-Day War in 1967, Hizma has been under Israeli occupation. The population in the 1967 census conducted by the Israeli authorities was 1,109, 5 of whom were refugees from the previous war.

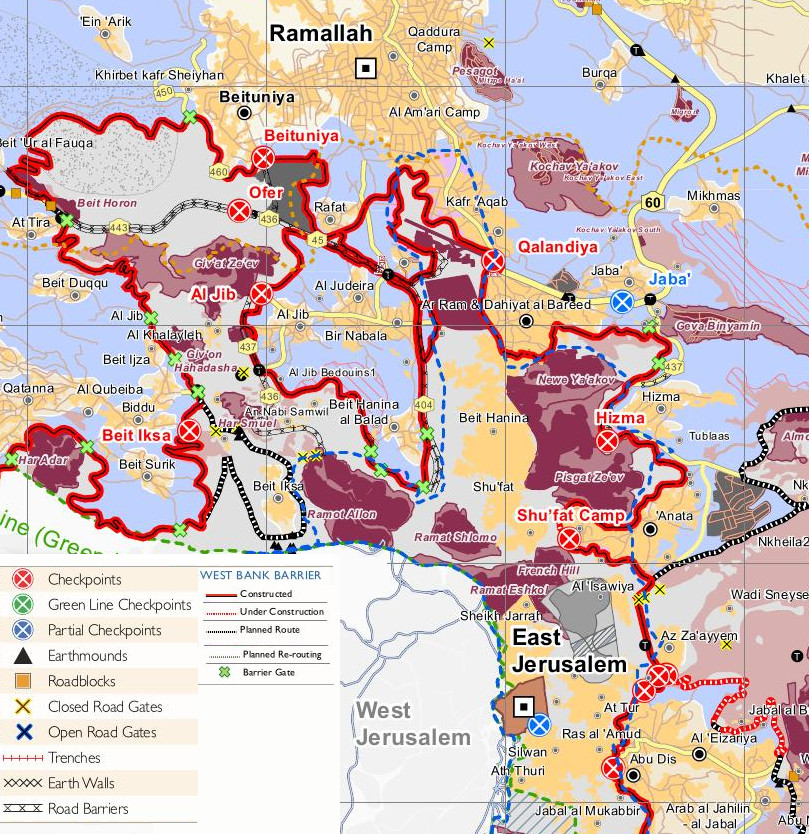
Map of northern Jerusalem, with Hizma on the right

In the 1970-1980s 19% of the village's total area were expropriated by Israel in order to establish three Israeli settlements which are considered illegal by the international community:

- 1544 dunams of land were taken for Pisgat Amir,
- 385 dunams of land were taken for Neve Ya'akov,
- 89 dunams of land were taken for Pisgat Ze'ev.

After the 1995 accords, about 9% of the village area was classified as Area B, while the remaining 91% became Area C.

There is a bypass road connecting the settlements with the neighboring Israeli settlements. There is also a buffer zone of 75 meters along the roads on each side. Palestinians in Gaza and the West Bank are prohibited from using these roads, only Israelis and foreign nationals can use them, the status purpose being security concerns.

==== West Bank barrier ====
The Israel-West Bank barrier cuts off 40% of the village's area, with the Israeli side incorporating the settlements and surrounding forests, agricultural lands, open spaces, and a small part of the Palestinian residential area. As of 2012, an Israeli checkpoint located west of the village at an opening in the controls the passage to and from Hizma. Palestinians living outside Jerusalem must have a special permit that is reportedly hard to obtain. Israeli citizens (including settlers) and permanent residents (including Palestinians in East Jerusalem) are allowed to pass in and out without any permits.

==== Israeli administration ====
Israeli authorities demolish the homes of Palestinians built without permits. Strict conditions for Palestinians applying for permits must be fulfilled and the permits are usually denied.

The village has on occasion been sealed off with road blocks in response to reported stone-throwing and rioting, characterized by many rights groups as a form of collective punishment.

== Economy ==
In 2010, more than half of the workforce was working in the government or private employees sector; 22% was working in the Israeli labor market, 14% on agriculture, and 7% worked in the trade sector.

Hizma village is known for the cultivation of olives; 112 dunums of land were cultivated with olive trees in 2010. Cereals were grown on 233 dunums.

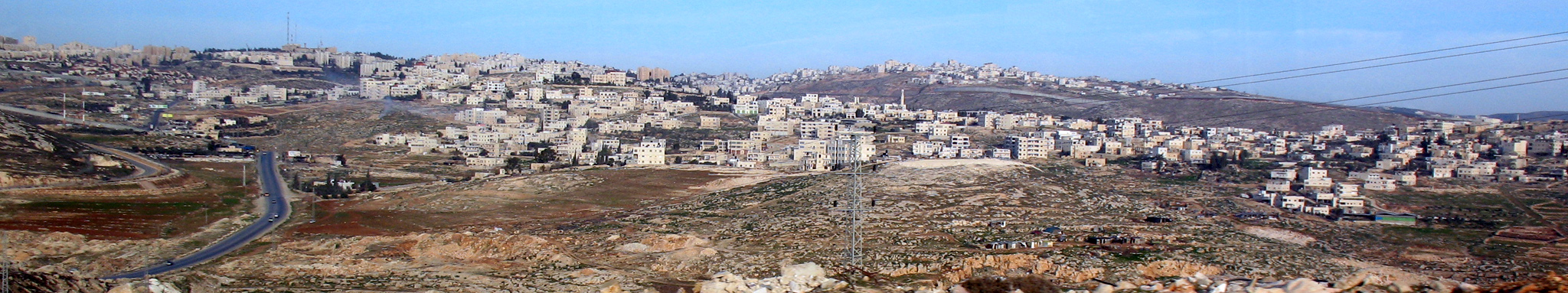
Panorama of Hizma

== People from Hizma ==
- Sulaiman Khatib

== Bibliography ==
- Albright, W.F. (1922–1923). "Excavations And Results At Tell El-Fûl (Gibeah Of Saul)". American Schools of Oriental Research, Annual.
- Barron, J.B., ed. (1923). Palestine: Report and General Abstracts of the Census of 1922. Government of Palestine.
- Conder, C.R.; Kitchener, H.H. (1883). The Survey of Western Palestine: Memoirs of the Topography, Orography, Hydrography, and Archaeology. Vol. 3. London: Committee of the Palestine Exploration Fund.
- Dauphin, C. (1998). La Palestine byzantine, Peuplement et Populations. BAR International Series 726 (in French). Vol. III: Catalogue. Oxford: Archeopress. ISBN 0-860549-05-4.
- First Census of Population and Housing. Volume I: Final Tables; General Characteristics of the Population (PDF). Government of Jordan, Department of Statistics. 1964.
- Gibson, S. (1983). "The Stone Vessel Industry at Ḥizma". Israel Exploration Journal. 33 (3/4): 176–188. JSTOR 27925895.
- Guérin, V. (1869). Description Géographique Historique et Archéologique de la Palestine (in French). Vol. 1: Judee, pt. 3. Paris: L'Imprimerie Nationale.
- Hadawi, S. (1970). Village Statistics of 1945: A Classification of Land and Area ownership in Palestine. Palestine Liberation Organization Research Center.
- Hartmann, M. (1883). "Die Ortschaftenliste des Liwa Jerusalem in dem türkischen Staatskalender für Syrien auf das Jahr 1288 der Flucht (1871)". Zeitschrift des Deutschen Palästina-Vereins. 6: 102–149.
- Hütteroth, W.-D.; Abdulfattah, K. (1977). Historical Geography of Palestine, Transjordan and Southern Syria in the Late 16th Century. Erlanger Geographische Arbeiten, Sonderband 5. Erlangen, Germany: Vorstand der Fränkischen Geographischen Gesellschaft. ISBN 3-920405-41-2.
- Mills, E., ed. (1932). Census of Palestine 1931. Population of Villages, Towns and Administrative Areas. Jerusalem: Government of Palestine.
- Palmer, E.H. (1881). The Survey of Western Palestine: Arabic and English Name Lists Collected During the Survey by Lieutenants Conder and Kitchener, R. E. Transliterated and Explained by E.H. Palmer. Committee of the Palestine Exploration Fund.
- Robinson, E.; Smith, E. (1841). Biblical Researches in Palestine, Mount Sinai and Arabia Petraea: A Journal of Travels in the year 1838. Vol. 2. Boston: Crocker & Brewster.
- Robinson, E.; Smith, E. (1841). Biblical Researches in Palestine, Mount Sinai and Arabia Petraea: A Journal of Travels in the year 1838. Vol. 3. Boston: Crocker & Brewster.
- Schick, C. (1896). "Zur Einwohnerzahl des Bezirks Jerusalem". Zeitschrift des Deutschen Palästina-Vereins. 19: 120–127.
- Socin, A. (1879). "Alphabetisches Verzeichniss von Ortschaften des Paschalik Jerusalem". Zeitschrift des Deutschen Palästina-Vereins. 2: 135–163.
- Toledano, E. (1984). "The Sanjaq of Jerusalem in the Sixteenth Century: Aspects of Topography and Population". Archivum Ottomanicum. 9: 279–319.
- Village Statistics, April, 1945. Government of Palestine, Department of Statistics. 1945.
