= Jerusalem =

City in the Southern Levant

Jerusalem: יְרוּשָׁלַיִם (Hebrew); القُدس (Arabic)
- Metropolis
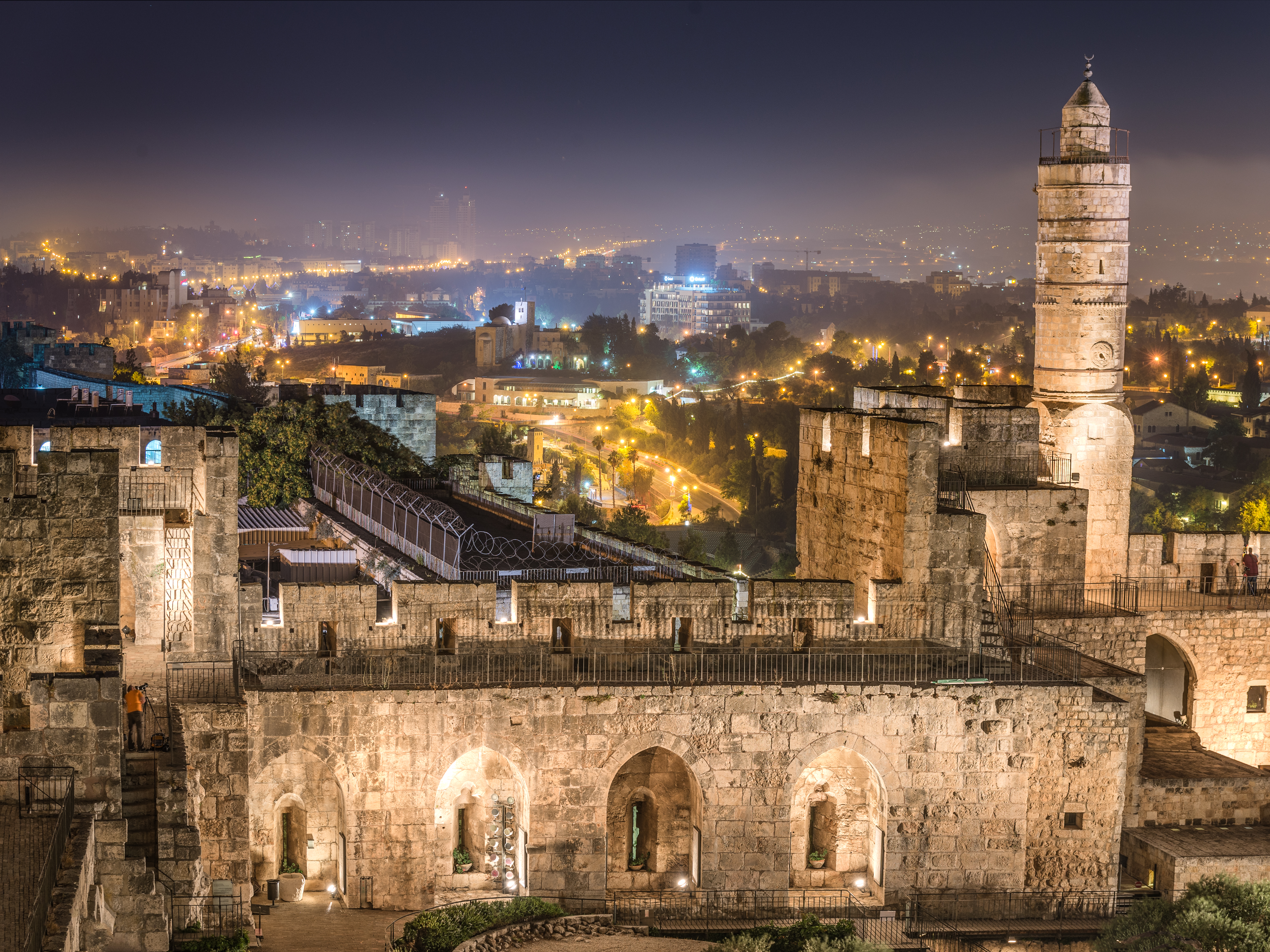
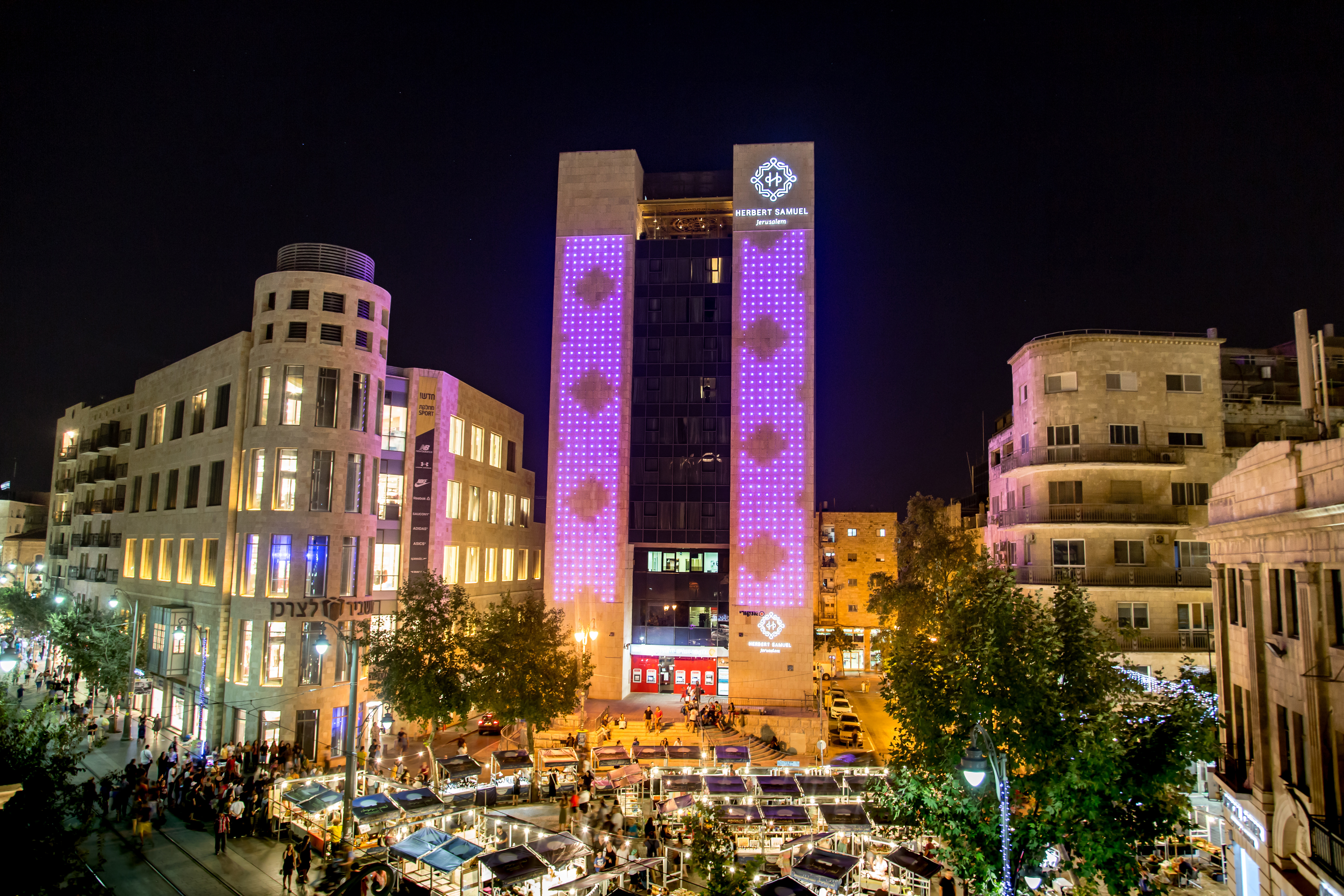
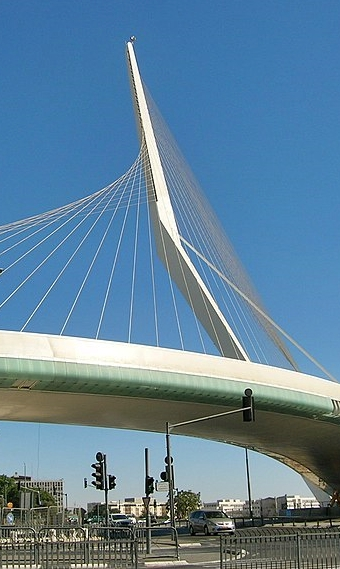
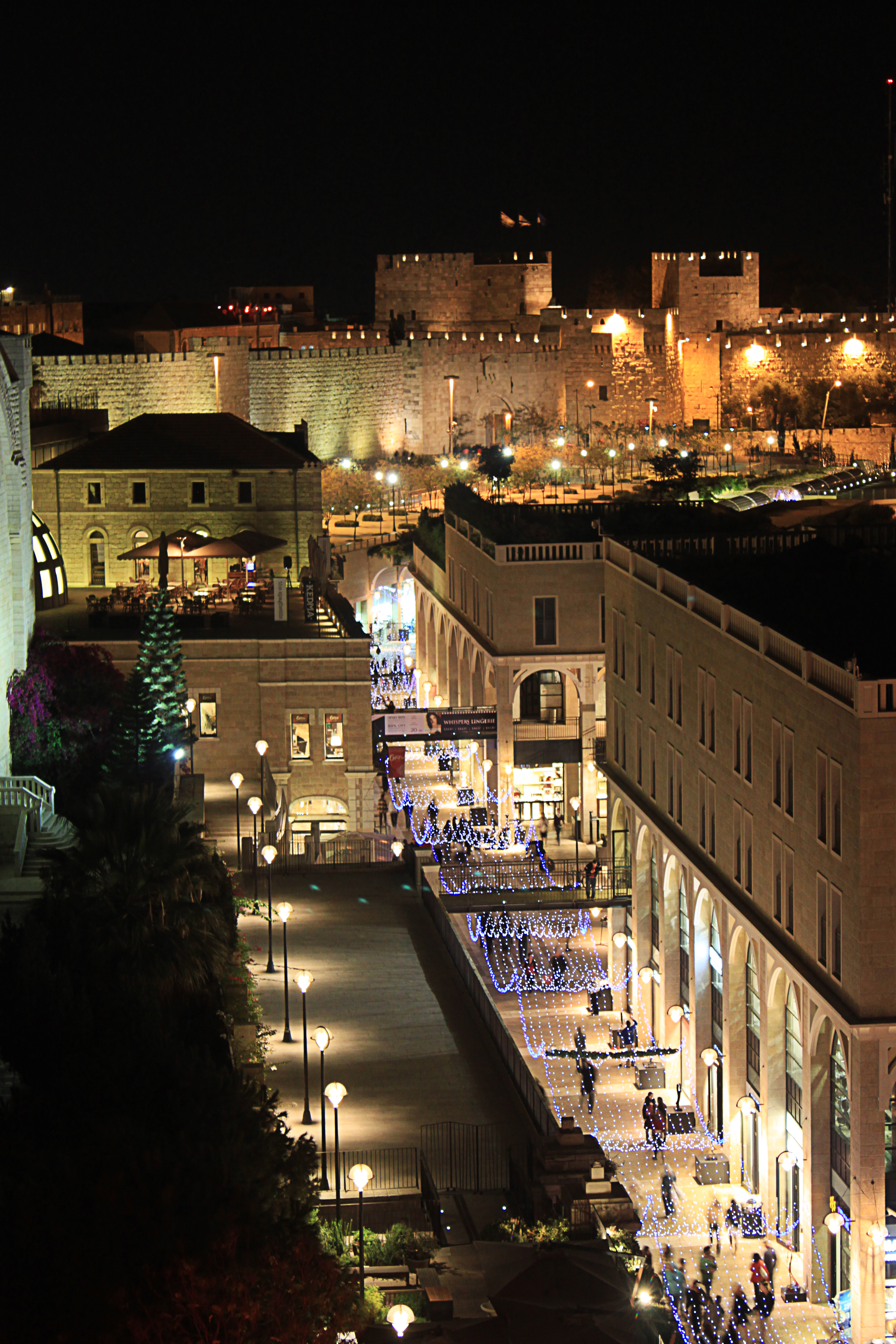
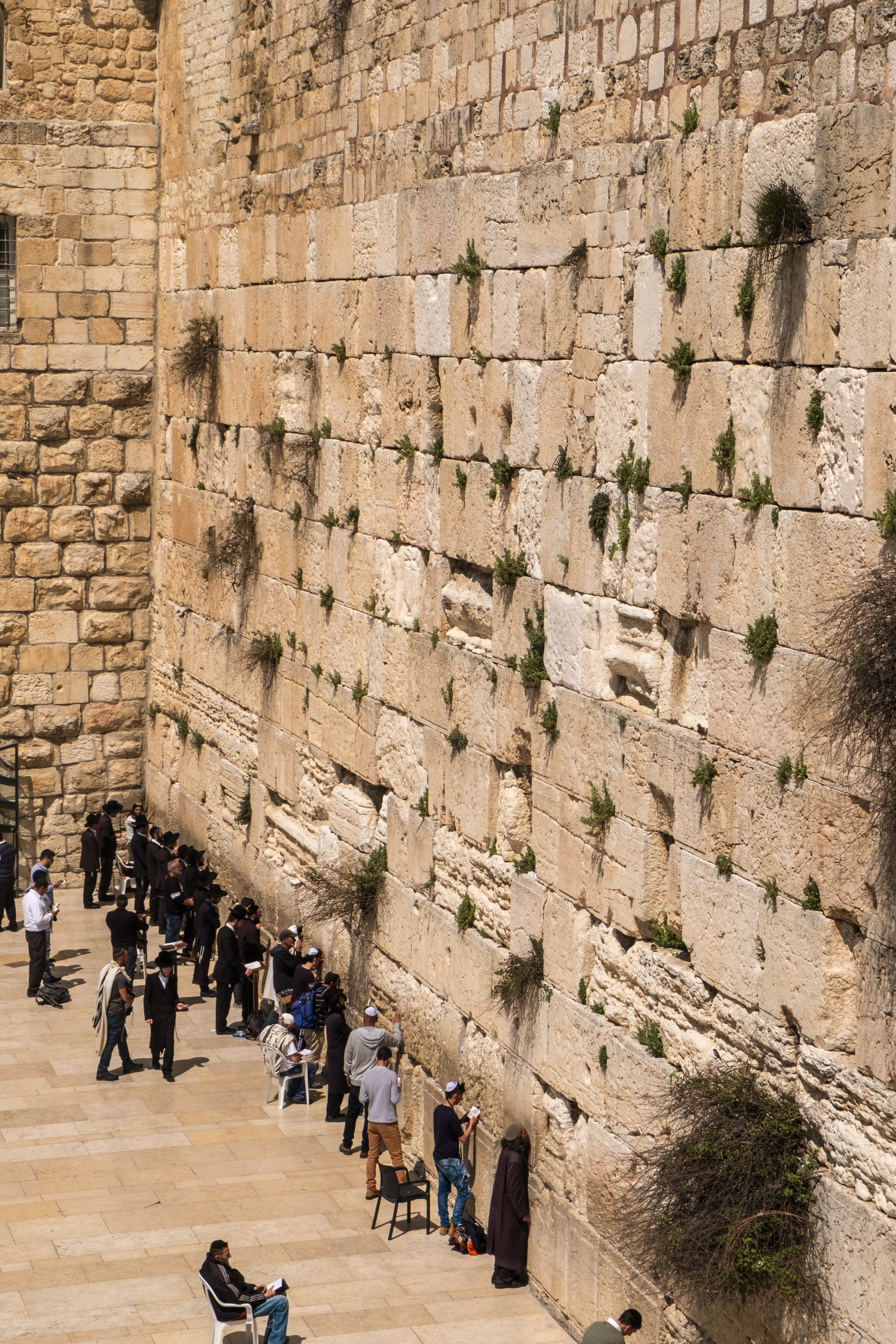
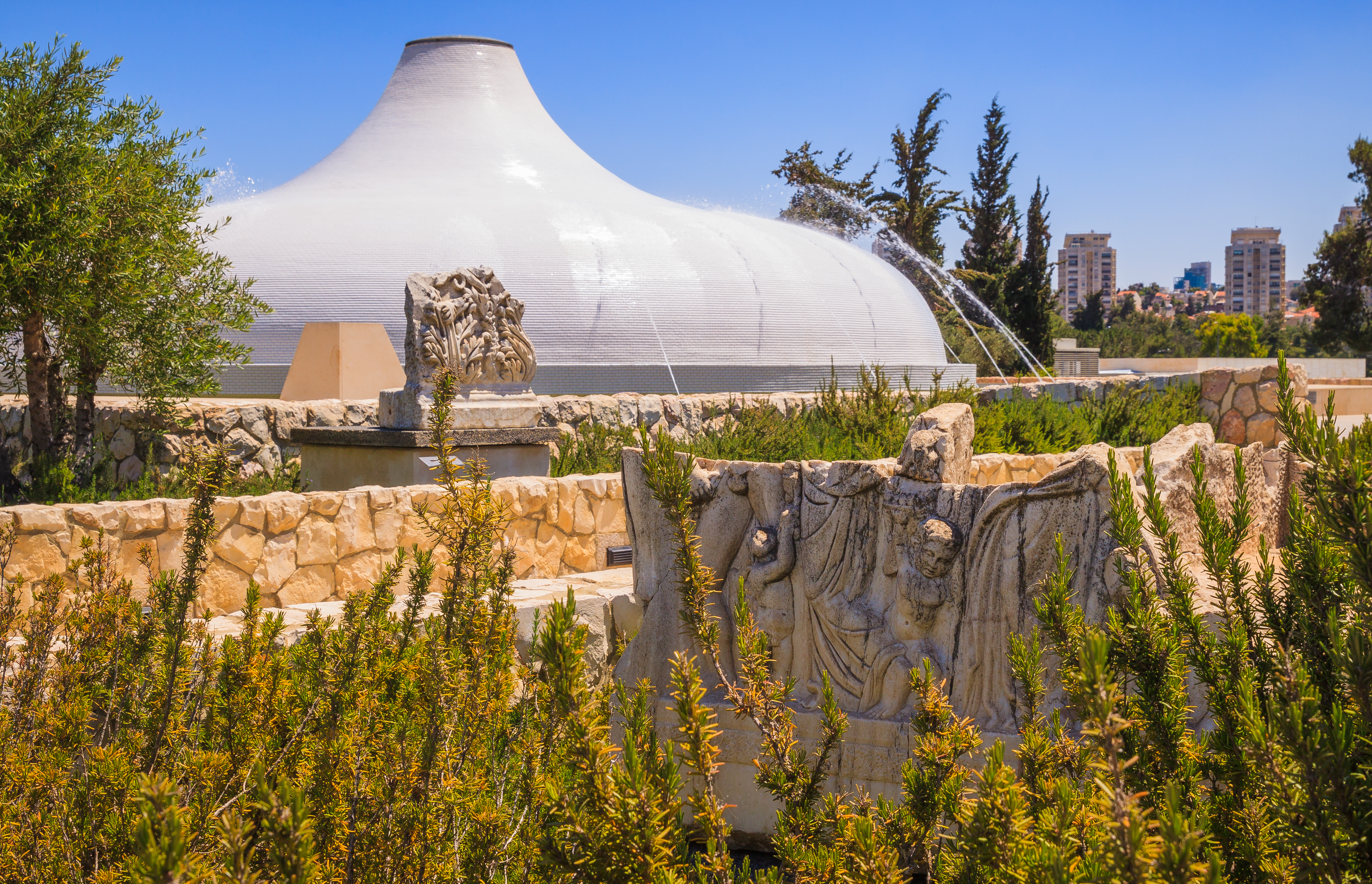
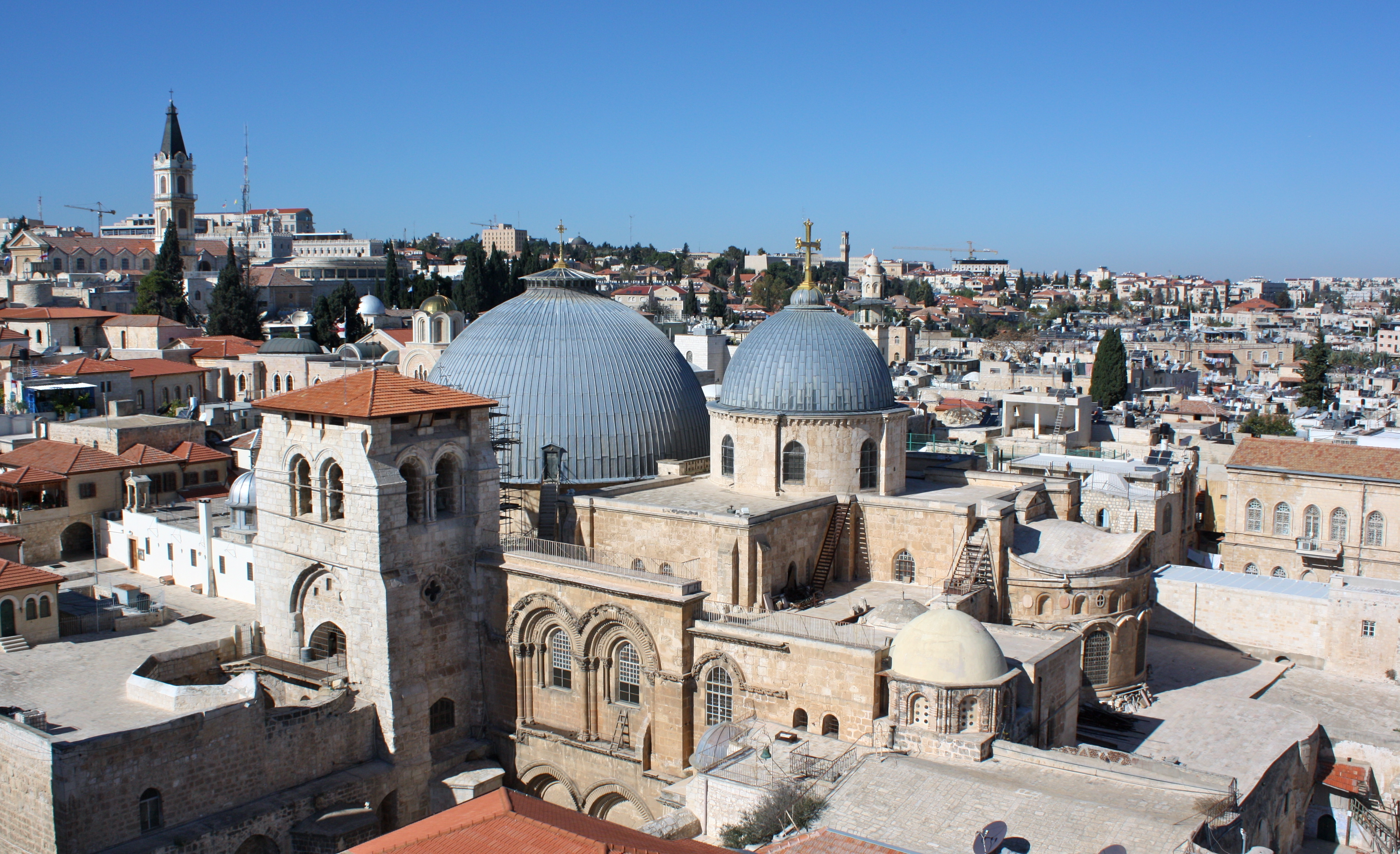
- Old City from the Mount of Olives with Al-Aqsa and Dome of the Rock on the Temple Mount Tower of David Zion Square Chords Bridge Mamilla Mall Western Wall Shrine of the Book Holy Sepulchre

- Seal
- Nicknames: Ir ha-Kodesh (The Holy City); Bayt al-Maqdis (House of the Holiness)
- Interactive map of Jerusalem
- Location within Israel Location within State of Palestine Location within Middle East Location within Asia
- Coordinates: 31°46′44″N 35°13′32″E
- Administered by: Israel
- Claimed by: Israel and Palestine (Note: The State of Palestine (according to the Basic Law of Palestine, Title One: Article 3) regards Jerusalem as its capital. However, the documents of the PLO's Negotiations Affairs Department (NAD) often refer to East Jerusalem (rather than the whole of Jerusalem) as a future capital, and sometimes as the current capital. One of its 2010 documents, described as "for discussion purposes only", says that Palestine has a "vision" for a future in which "East Jerusalem [...] shall be the capital of Palestine, and West Jerusalem shall be the capital of Israel." One of its 2013 documents refers to "Palestine's capital, East Jerusalem", and states that "Occupied East Jerusalem is the natural socio-economic and political center for the future Palestinian state", while also stating that "Jerusalem has always been and remains the political, administrative and spiritual heart of Palestine" and that "The Palestinian acceptance of the 1967 border, which includes East Jerusalem, is a painful compromise".)
- Israeli district: Jerusalem
- Natural Region: Judean Mountains
- Palestinian governorate: Quds
- Gihon Spring settlement: 3000–2800 BCE
- City of David: c. 1000 BCE
- Present Old City walls built: 1541
- East-West Jerusalem division: 1948
- Israeli annexation of East Jerusalem: 1967
- Jerusalem Law: 1980
- Seat: Jerusalem Municipality

Government
  - Type: Mayor–council
  - Body: Jerusalem City Council
  - Mayor: Moshe Lion (Likud)

Area
  - Metropolis: 125,156 dunams (125.156 km^{2}; 48.323 sq mi)
  - Metro: 652,000 dunams (652 km^{2}; 252 sq mi)
- Elevation: 754 m (2,474 ft)

Population (2024)
  - Metropolis: 1,050,153
  - Density: 8,390.75/km^{2} (21,731.9/sq mi)
  - Metro: 1,253,900
- Demonyms: Jerusalemite; (Hebrew: Yerushalmi); (Arabic: Qudsi, Maqdisi)
- Time zone: UTC+02:00 (IST, PST)
  - Summer (DST): UTC+03:00 (IDT, PDT)
- Postal code: 9XXXXXX
- Area code: +972-2
- Website: jerusalem.muni.il

UNESCO World Heritage Site
- Official name: Old City of Jerusalem and its Walls
- Type: Cultural
- Criteria: ii, iii, vi
- Designated: 1981
- Reference no.: 148
- Region: Arab States
- Endangered: 1982–present

Jerusalem (Note: /dʒəˈruːsələmˌ -zə-/ jə-ROO-sə-ləm, -zə-; Hebrew: יְרוּשָׁלַיִם, romanised: Yerushaláyim, pronounced [jeʁuʃaˈlajim]; Also known as Quds or al-Quds Arabic: القُدس, romanised: al-Quds, pronounced [al.quds], locally [il.ʔuds]; Official Israel Arabic: أورشليم القدس, romanised: ʾŪršalīm al-Quds (combining the Biblical and common usage Arabic names) In other languages: Koine Greek: Ἱερουσαλήμ/Ἰερουσαλήμ/Ἱεροσόλυμα/Ἰεροσόλυμα/Ἱεροσάλημα, romanised: Hierousalḗm, Ierousalḗm, Hierosóluma, Ierosóluma, Hierosálēma Armenian: Երուսաղեմ, romanised: Erusałēm) is a city in the Southern Levant, on a plateau in the Judaean Mountains between the Mediterranean and the Dead Sea. It is one of the oldest cities in the world and is considered a holy city to the three major Abrahamic religions: Judaism, Christianity and Islam. Both Israel and Palestine claim Jerusalem as their capital city; Israel maintains its primary governmental institutions there, while Palestine ultimately foresees it as its seat of power. Neither claim is widely recognised internationally. (Note: Jerusalem is the capital under Israeli law. The presidential residence, government offices, supreme court and parliament (Knesset) are there. The State of Palestine (according to the Basic Law of Palestine, Title One: Article 3) regards Jerusalem as its capital. The UN and most countries do not recognise Jerusalem as Israel's capital, taking the position that the final status of Jerusalem is pending future negotiations between Israel and the Palestinian Authority. Most countries maintain their embassies in Tel Aviv and its suburbs or suburbs of Jerusalem, such as Mevaseret Zion (see "Map of Israel" (PDF). Archived (PDF) from the original on 1 June 2020. (319 KB)) See Status of Jerusalem for more information.)

At present, the status of Jerusalem remains one of the core issues in the Israeli–Palestinian conflict. Under the 1947 United Nations Partition Plan for Palestine, Jerusalem was to be "established as a corpus separatum under a special international regime" administered by the United Nations. Following the 1948 Arab–Israeli War, an armistice agreements were reached in 1949 resulting in the division of Jerusalem into Israeli-controlled West Jerusalem and Jordanian-controlled East Jerusalem. This agreement remained until 1967, when Israel occupied East Jerusalem from Jordan following the Six-Day War and subsequently annexed it into the city's municipality, together with additional surrounding territory. (Note: West Jerusalem comprises approximately one third of the municipal area of Jerusalem, with East Jerusalem comprising approximately two-thirds. On the annexation of East Jerusalem, Israel also incorporated an area of the West Bank into the Jerusalem municipal area which represented more than ten times the area of East Jerusalem under Jordanian rule.) One of Israel's Basic Laws, the 1980 Jerusalem Law, refers to Jerusalem as the country's undivided capital. All branches of the Israeli government are located in Jerusalem, including the Knesset (Israel's parliament), the residences of the prime minister and president, and the Supreme Court.

Throughout its long history, Jerusalem has been destroyed completely at least twice, besieged 23 times, captured and recaptured 44 times, and attacked 52 times. The part of Jerusalem called the City of David shows first signs of settlement in the 4th millennium BCE, in the shape of encampments of nomadic shepherds. During the Canaanite period (14th century BCE) Jerusalem was named as Urusalim on ancient Egyptian tablets, probably meaning "foundation of [the god] Shalem" after a Canaanite deity. Radiocarbon dating of 103 samples from Iron Age Jerusalem provides evidence for settlement in the 12th–10th centuries BCE, westward expansion and extensive construction by the 9th century BCE, and subsequent fortification and growth until the Babylonian destruction in 586 BCE. In 1538 the city walls were rebuilt for a last time around Jerusalem under Suleiman the Magnificent of the Ottoman Empire. Today those walls define the Old City, which since the 19th century has been divided into four quarters—the Armenian, Christian, Jewish and Muslim quarters. The Old City became a World Heritage Site in 1981, and is on the List of World Heritage in Danger. Since 1860 Jerusalem has grown far beyond the Old City's boundaries. In 2024 Jerusalem had a population of 1,050,153. In 2022 60% were Jews and almost 40% were Palestinians. (Note: Statistics regarding the demographics of Jerusalem refer to the unified and expanded Israeli municipality, which includes the pre-1967 Israeli and Jordanian municipalities as well as several additional Palestinian villages and neighbourhoods to the northeast. Some of the Palestinian villages and neighbourhoods have been relinquished to the West Bank de facto by way of the Israeli West Bank barrier, but their legal statuses have not been reverted.) In 2020 the population was 951,100, of which Jews comprised 570,100 (59.9%), Muslims 353,800 (37.2%), Christians 16,300 (1.7%) and 10,800 unclassified (1.1%).

According to the Hebrew Bible, King David conquered the city from the Jebusites and established it as the capital of the United Kingdom of Israel, and his son King Solomon commissioned the building of the First Temple. (Note: Much of the information regarding King David's conquest of Jerusalem comes from Biblical accounts, but some modern-day historians have begun to give them credit due to a 1993 excavation.) Modern scholars argue that Israelites branched out of the Canaanite peoples and culture and developed a distinct monolatrous—and later monotheistic—religion centred on El/Yahweh. These foundational events assumed central symbolic importance for the Jewish people. The sobriquet of holy city (Hebrew: עיר הקודש, romanised: 'Ir ha-Qodesh) was probably attached to Jerusalem in post-exilic times. The holiness of Jerusalem in Christianity, conserved in the Greek translation of the Hebrew Bible, which Christians adopted as the Old Testament, was reinforced by the New Testament account of Jesus's crucifixion and resurrection there. In Islam, Jerusalem is the third-holiest city, after Mecca and Medina. The city was the first standard direction for Muslim prayers, and in Islamic tradition, Muhammad made his Night Journey there in 621, ascending to heaven where he spoke to God, per the Quran. As a result, despite having an area of only 0.9 km^{2} (3/8 sq mi), the Old City is home to many sites of seminal religious importance, among them the Al-Aqsa Mosque Compound on the Temple Mount with its Western Wall, Dome of the Rock and Qibli (al-Aqsa) Mosque, and the Church of the Holy Sepulchre.

== Etymology and names ==
=== Etymology ===
The name Jerusalem is variously etymologised to mean 'foundation of the god Shalem', from the Semitic root yry which can mean 'to found, to lay a cornerstone' and is used that way at least twice in the Hebrew Bible, in Job and Genesis. The god Shalem was thus the original tutelary deity of the Bronze Age city.

Shalim or Shalem was the name of the god of dusk in the Canaanite religion, whose name is based on the same root S-L-M from which the Hebrew word for "peace" is derived (Shalom in Hebrew, cognate with Arabic Salam). The name thus offered itself to etymologisations such as "The City of Peace", "Abode of Peace", "Dwelling of Peace" ("founded in safety"), or "Vision of Peace" in some Christian authors.

The ending -ayim indicates the dual, thus leading to the suggestion that the name Yerushalayim refers to the fact that the city initially sat on two hills.

=== Ancient Egyptian sources ===
The Execration Texts of the Middle Kingdom of Egypt (c. 19th century BCE), which refer to a city called rwšꜣlmm or ꜣwšꜣmm, variously transcribed as Rušalimum, or Urušalimum, may indicate Jerusalem. Alternatively, the Amarna letters of Abdi-Heba (1330s BCE), which reference an Úrušalim, may be the earliest mention of the city.

=== Hebrew Bible and Jewish sources ===
The form Yerushalem (Hebrew: ירושלם) or Yerushalayim (Hebrew: ירושלים) first appears in the Bible, in the Book of Joshua. Jerusalem is mentioned 669 times in the Hebrew Bible, while the term Zion appears 154 times as either a symbolic mention of Jerusalem or as a reference to the entire Land of Israel.

According to a Midrash, the name is a combination of two names united by God, Yireh ("the abiding place", the name given by Abraham to the place where he planned to sacrifice his son) and Shalem ("Place of Peace", the name given by high priest Shem). 2 Chronicles ascribes Mount Moriah, the traditional location of the Binding of Isaac, as the site where King Solomon built the First Temple.

=== Oldest written mention of Jerusalem ===
One of the earliest extra-biblical Hebrew writing of the word Jerusalem is dated to the sixth or seventh century BCE and was discovered in Khirbet Beit Lei near Beit Guvrin in 1961. The inscription states: "I am Yahweh thy God, I will accept the cities of Judah and I will redeem Jerusalem", or as other scholars suggest: "Yahweh is the God of the whole earth. The mountains of Judah belong to him, to the God of Jerusalem". An earlier example of the name appears in a papyrus from the 7th century BCE.

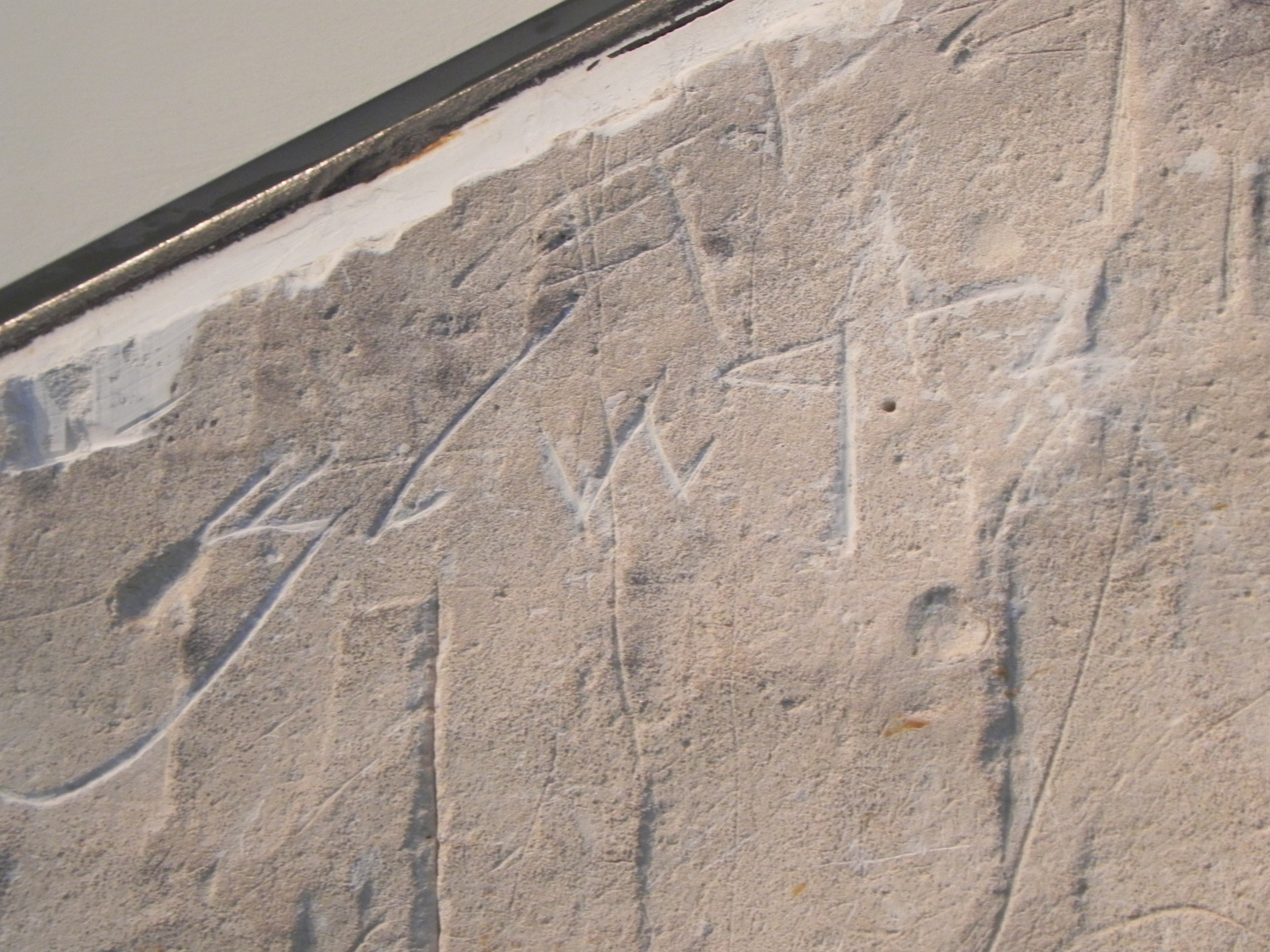
Close up of the Khirbet Beit Lei inscription, showing the earliest extra-biblical Hebrew writing of the word Jerusalem, dated to the seventh or sixth century BCE

A papyrus fragment from the Judean Desert that has been interpreted as reading "from the king’s maidservant, from Naharata, jars of wine, to Jerusalem" was dated approximately to the seventh century BCE using a combination of palaeographic analysis of the script and radiocarbon dating.

In extra-biblical inscriptions, the earliest known example of the -ayim ending was discovered on a column about 3 km west of ancient Jerusalem, dated to the first century BCE.

=== Jebus, Zion, City of David ===
An ancient settlement of Jerusalem, founded as early as the Bronze Age on the hill above the Gihon Spring, was, according to the Bible, named Jebus. Called the "Fortress of Zion" (metsudat Zion), it was renamed as the "City of David", and was known by this name in antiquity. Another name, "Zion", initially referred to a distinct part of the city, but later came to signify the city as a whole, and afterwards to represent the whole biblical Land of Israel.

=== Greek, Roman and Byzantine names ===
In Greek and Latin the city's name was transliterated Hierosolyma/Hierosoluma (Greek: Ἱεροσόλυμα; in Greek hieròs, ἱερός, means holy), and was the term used by Matthew and Mark in their gospels instead of the Hebrew term.

Up until the 2010s the consensus among historians was that following Alexander the Great's conquest, Hierosoluma was set to be incorporated into the larger temple cities of the Seleucid kingdom, and to be Hellenised as Hierapolis. However, modern historians dispute this as a proper Ancient Greek translation for the polis would be similar to Hierolophos.

After the Bar Kokhba revolt (132–136 CE), the city was renamed Aelia Capitolina during the Roman period of its history. Named for the Roman emperor Hadrian and the deities of Rome, the name lasted until the Byzantine era.

=== Salem ===
The Biblical city "Salem" (שלם), said to be the kingdom of Melchizedek in Genesis 14, has traditionally been identified with Jerusalem, reflecting an early name of the city. Josephus, the early Aramaic translations of the relevant verse, as well as the Aramaic Apocryphon of Genesis of the Dead Sea Scrolls (1QapGen 22:13), all make this identification. Salem as an early name for Jerusalem is also indicated by the liturgical poetry in Psalms, which equates Salem with Zion, used as a synonym for Jerusalem.

Other early Hebrew sources, early Christian renderings of the verse and targumim, however, put Salem in Northern Israel near Shechem (Sichem), now Nablus, a city of some importance in early sacred Hebrew writing. Possibly the redactor of the Apocryphon of Genesis wanted to dissociate Melchizedek from the area of Shechem, which at the time was in possession of the Samaritans. However that may be, later Rabbinic sources also equate Salem with Jerusalem, mainly to link Melchizedek to later Temple traditions. Samaritan tradition, which consencrated Mount Gerizim over Jerusalem, referred to the later as Cursed Salem (Arur-Shalem ארור שלם).

=== Arabic names ===
Originally titled Bayt al-Maqdis, today, Jerusalem is most commonly known in Arabic as القُدس, transliterated as al-Quds and meaning "the holy" or "the holy sanctuary", cognate with Hebrew: הקדש, romanised: ha-qodesh. The name is possibly a shortened form of مدينة القُدس Madīnat al-Quds "city of the holy sanctuary" after the Hebrew nickname with the same meaning, Ir ha-Qodesh (עיר הקדש). The ق (Q) is pronounced either with a voiceless uvular plosive (/q/), as in Classical Arabic, or with a glottal stop (ʔ) as in Levantine Arabic. Official Israeli government policy mandates that أُورُشَلِيمَ, transliterated as Ūrušalīm, which is the name frequently used in Christian translations of the Bible into Arabic, be used as the Arabic language name for the city in conjunction with القُدس, giving أُورُشَلِيمَ-القُدس, Ūrušalīm-al-Quds. Palestinian Arab families who hail from this city are often called "Qudsi" (قُدسي) or "Maqdasi" (مقدسي), while Palestinian Muslim Jerusalemites may use these terms as a demonym.

== History ==
Jerusalem is one of the world's oldest cities, with a history spanning over 5,000 years. Its origins trace back to around 3000 BCE, with the first settlement near the Gihon Spring. The city is first mentioned in Egyptian Execration texts around 2000 BCE as "Rusalimum." By the 17th century BCE Jerusalem had developed into a fortified city under Canaanite rule, with massive walls protecting its water system. During the Late Bronze Age Jerusalem became a vassal of Ancient Egypt, as documented in the Amarna letters.

The city's importance grew during the Israelite period, which began around 1000 BCE when King David captured Jerusalem and made it the capital of the United Kingdom of Israel. David's son King Solomon built the First Temple, establishing the city as a major religious centre. Following the kingdom's split, Jerusalem became the capital of the Kingdom of Judah until it was captured by the Neo-Babylonian Empire in 586 BCE. The Babylonians destroyed the First Temple, leading to the Babylonian exile of the Jewish population. After the Persian conquest of Babylon in 539 BCE, Cyrus the Great allowed the Jews to return from exile and rebuild the city and its temple, whose construction began c. 516 BCE, marking the start of the Second Temple period. Jerusalem fell under Hellenistic rule after the conquests of Alexander the Great in 332 BCE, leading to increasing cultural and political influence from Greece. The Hasmonean revolt in 164 BCE briefly restored Jewish sovereignty, with Jerusalem as the capital of an independent state.

In 63 BCE, Jerusalem was captured by Pompey and brought under the rule of the Roman Republic. The city was embellished by Herod the Great, who erected a series of supporting walls that allowed for the enlargement of the Temple Mount and the expansion of the Second Temple, making it one of the largest sanctuaries in the ancient world. Tensions between the Jews and the Roman Empire eventually escalated into the First Jewish Revolt, resulting in the siege and destruction of Jerusalem and the Second Temple in 70 CE. A few decades later, the city was rebuilt as the Roman colony Aelia Capitolina, dedicated to Jupiter, provoking the Bar Kokhba Revolt (132–136 CE). After the revolt's suppression, Jews were banned from the city. During the Byzantine period, Jerusalem gained prominence as a centre of Christian pilgrimage, especially after Constantine the Great supported the construction of the Church of the Holy Sepulchre. In 638 CE, Jerusalem was conquered by the Rashidun Caliphate, and under early Islamic rule, the Dome of the Rock and Qibli (al-Aqsa) Mosque were built, solidifying its religious importance in Islam.

During the Crusades Jerusalem changed hands multiple times, being captured by the Crusaders in 1099 and recaptured by Saladin in 1187. It remained under Islamic control through the Ayyubid and Mamluk periods, until it became part of the Ottoman Empire in 1517. In the modern period Jerusalem was divided between Israel and Jordan after the 1948 Arab–Israeli War. Israel captured East Jerusalem during the Six-Day War in 1967, uniting the city under Israeli control. The status of Jerusalem remains a highly contentious issue, with both Israelis and Palestinians claiming it as their capital. Historiographically, the city's history is often interpreted through the lens of competing national narratives. Israeli scholars emphasise the ancient Jewish connection to the city, while Palestinian narratives highlight the city's broader historical and multicultural significance. Both perspectives influence contemporary discussions of Jerusalem's status and future.

== Political status ==
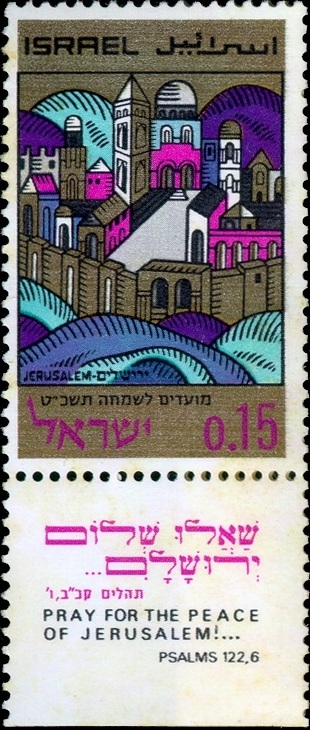
An Israeli stamp from 1968, quoting Psalm 122:6; Pray for the peace of Jerusalem!...

From 1923 until 1948 Jerusalem served as the administrative capital of Mandatory Palestine.

In December 1949, Israeli prime minister David Ben-Gurion declared the area of West Jerusalem that it controlled as "Israel's eternal capital," a policy that was affirmed by the Knesset in January 1950. This policy was not recognised as such internationally because UN General Assembly Resolution 194 envisaged Jerusalem as an international city; the American government opposed the move and insisted that Israel's capital remain in Tel Aviv. As a result of the Six-Day War in 1967, the whole of Jerusalem came under Israeli control. On 27 June 1967, the government of Levi Eshkol extended Israeli law and jurisdiction to East Jerusalem, but agreed that administration of the Temple Mount compound would be maintained by the Jordanian waqf, under the Jordanian Ministry of Religious Endowments.

In 1988, the Israeli government ordered the closure of Orient House, home of the Arab Studies Society and headquarters of the Palestine Liberation Organization, for security reasons. The building reopened in 1992 as a Palestinian guesthouse. The Oslo Accords stated that the final status of Jerusalem would be determined by negotiations with the Palestinian Authority. The accords banned any official Palestinian presence in the city until a final peace agreement, but provided for the opening of a Palestinian trade office in East Jerusalem. The Palestinian Authority regards East Jerusalem as the capital of a future Palestinian state.

President Mahmoud Abbas has said that any agreement that did not include East Jerusalem as the capital of Palestine would be unacceptable. Israeli Prime Minister Benjamin Netanyahu has similarly stated that Jerusalem would remain the undivided capital of Israel. Due to its proximity to the city, especially the Temple Mount, Abu Dis, a Palestinian suburb of Jerusalem, has been proposed as the future capital of a Palestinian state by Israel. Israel has not incorporated Abu Dis within its security wall around Jerusalem. The Palestinian Authority has built a possible future parliament building for the Palestinian Legislative Council in the town, and its Jerusalem Affairs Offices are all located in Abu Dis.

=== International status ===
Most of the international community regards East Jerusalem, including the entire Old City, as part of the occupied Palestinian territories. The United States recognized Israeli control over all of Jerusalem in 2017. Until then neither part, West or East Jerusalem, was recognized as part of the territory of the State of Israel or the State of Palestine. The move was followed by additional states to recognizing West Jerusalem as part of Israel or East Jerusalem as part of a future State of Palestine. Under the United Nations Partition Plan for Palestine adopted by the General Assembly of the United Nations in 1947, Jerusalem was envisaged to become a corpus separatum administered by the United Nations for ten years, following which city residents would be able to "express by means of a referendum their wishes." In the war of 1948 the western part of the city was occupied by forces of the nascent state of Israel, while the eastern part was occupied by Jordan. The international community largely considers the legal status of Jerusalem to derive from the partition plan, and correspondingly most refuse to recognise Israeli sovereignty over the city.

=== Status under Israeli rule ===
Following the 1967 Six-Day War, Israel extended its jurisdiction and administration over East Jerusalem, establishing new municipal borders.

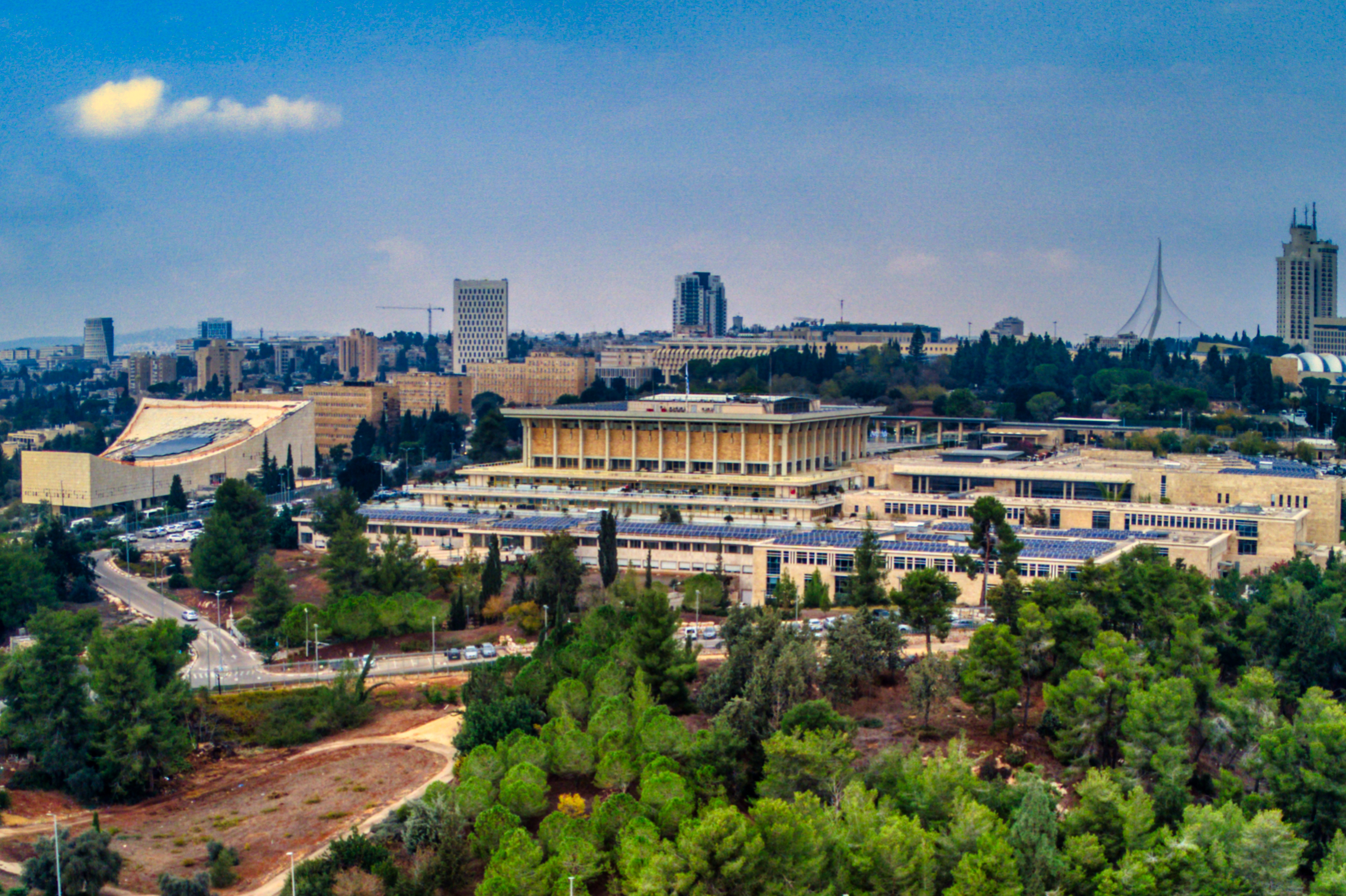
The Knesset houses the legislature of Israel

In 2010 Israel approved legislation giving Jerusalem the highest national priority status in Israel. The law prioritised construction throughout the city, and offered grants and tax benefits to residents to make housing, infrastructure, education, employment, business, tourism and cultural events more affordable. Communications Minister Moshe Kahlon said that the bill sent "a clear, unequivocal political message that Jerusalem will not be divided", and that "all those within the Palestinian and international community who expect the current Israeli government to accept any demands regarding Israel's sovereignty over its capital are mistaken and misleading".

The status of the city, and especially its holy places, remains a core issue in the Israeli–Palestinian conflict. The Israeli government has approved building plans in the Muslim Quarter of the Old City in order to expand the Jewish presence in East Jerusalem, while some Islamic leaders have made claims that Jews have no historical connection to Jerusalem, alleging that the 2,500-year-old Western Wall was constructed as part of a mosque. Palestinians regard Jerusalem as the capital of the State of Palestine, and the city's borders have been the subject of bilateral talks. A team of experts assembled by the then Israeli Prime Minister Ehud Barak in 2000 concluded that the city must be divided, since Israel had failed to achieve any of its national aims there.

However, Israeli Prime Minister Benjamin Netanyahu said in 2014 that "Jerusalem will never be divided". A poll conducted in June 2013 found that 74% of Israeli Jews reject the idea of a Palestinian capital in any portion of Jerusalem, though 72% of the public regarded it as a divided city. A poll conducted by the Palestinian Centre for Public Opinion and American Pechter Middle East Polls for the Council on Foreign Relations among East Jerusalem Arab residents in 2011 revealed that 39% of East Jerusalem Arab residents would prefer Israeli citizenship, while 31% opted for Palestinian citizenship. According to the poll 40% of Palestinian residents would prefer to leave their neighbourhoods if they would be placed under Palestinian rule.

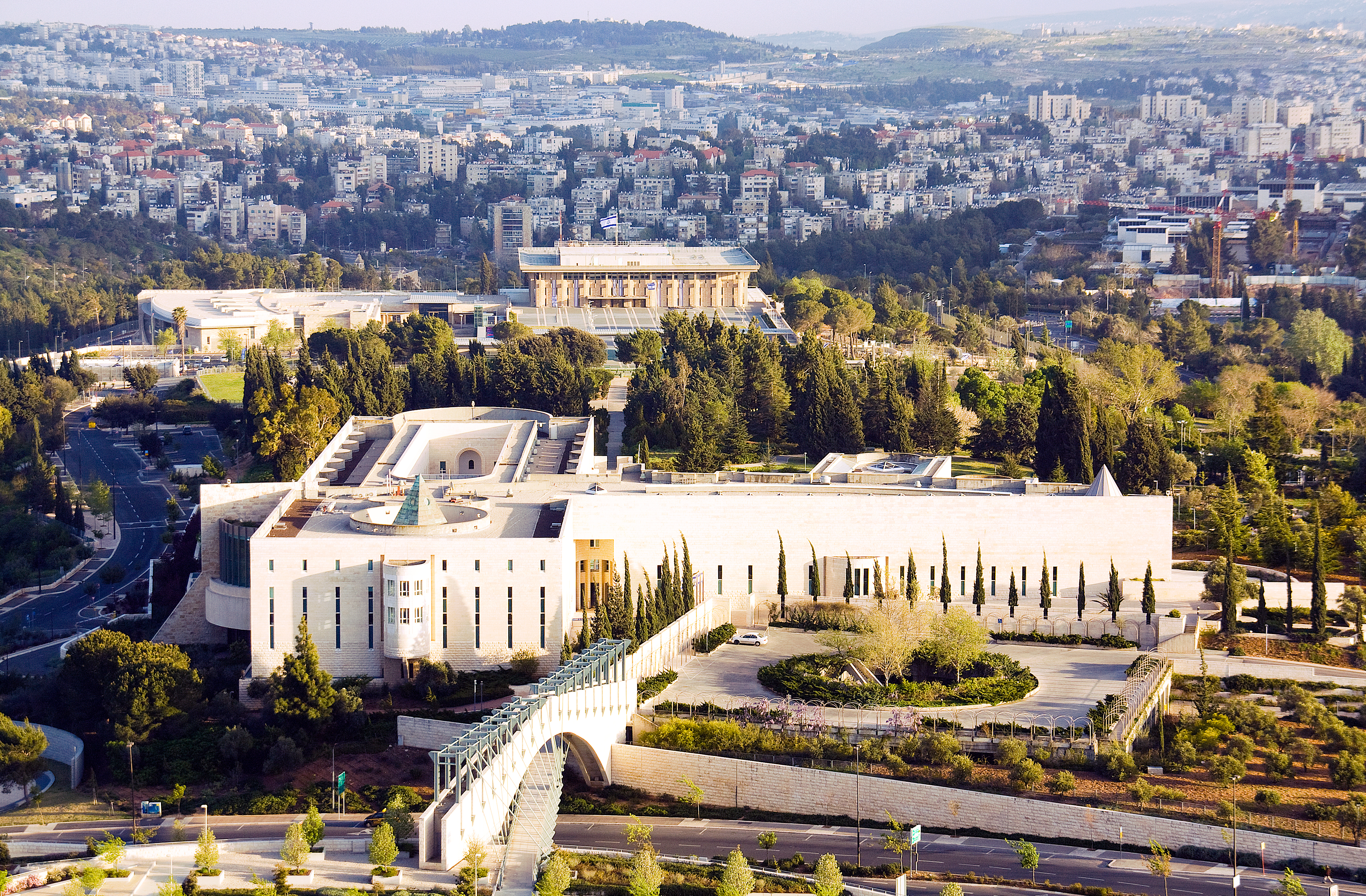
The Supreme Court of Israel

=== Jerusalem as capital of Israel ===
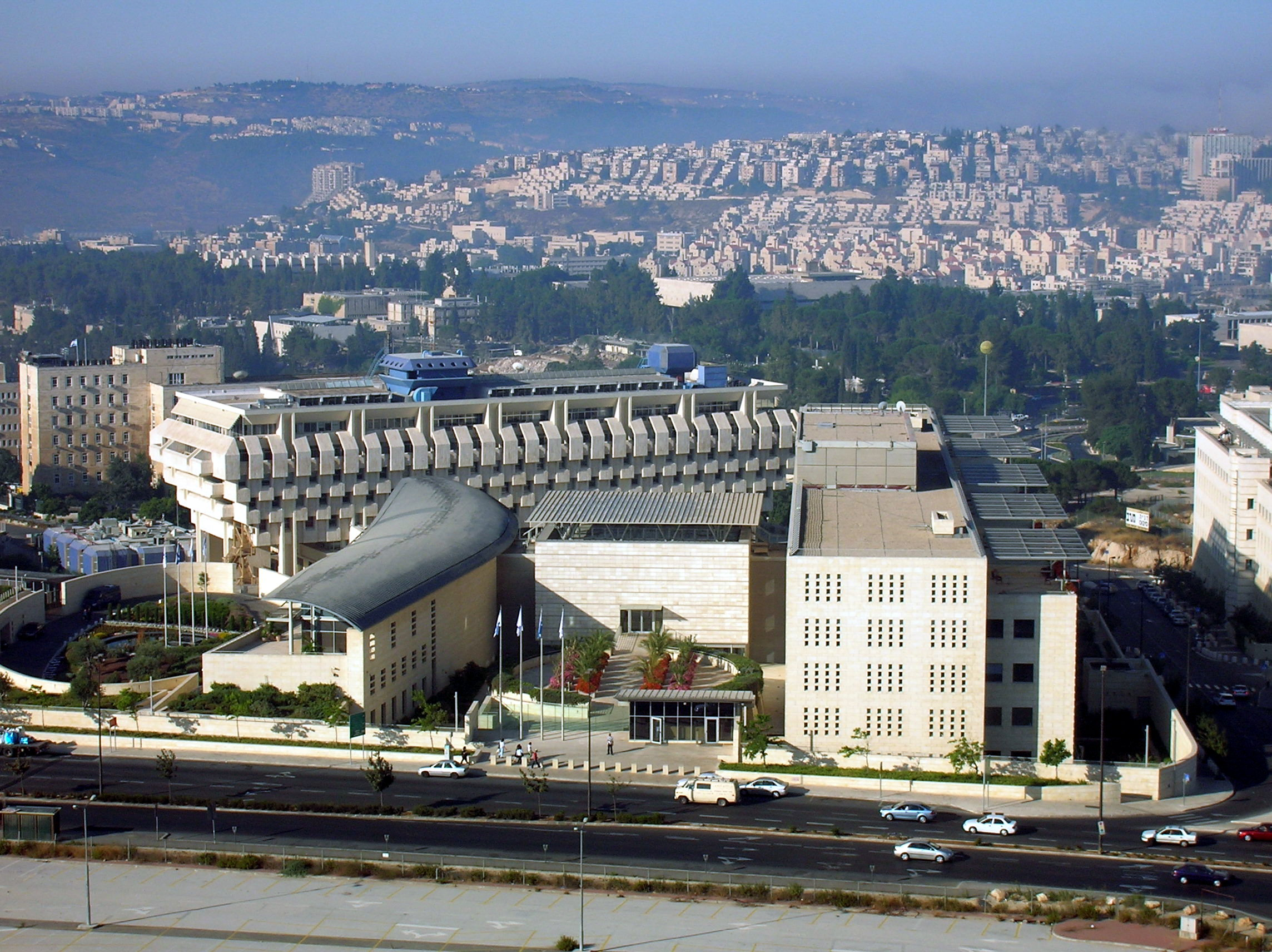
The Israeli Foreign Ministry building

On 5 December 1949 Israel's first prime minister, David Ben-Gurion, proclaimed Jerusalem as Israel's "eternal" and "sacred" capital, and eight days later specified that only the war had "compelled" the Israeli leadership "to establish the seat of Government in Tel Aviv", while "for the State of Israel there has always been and always will be one capital only—Jerusalem the Eternal", and that after the war, efforts had been ongoing for creating the conditions for "the Knesset... returning to Jerusalem." This indeed took place, and since the beginning of 1950 all branches of the Israeli government—legislative, judicial and executive—have resided there, except for the Ministry of Defense, which is located at HaKirya in Tel Aviv. At the time of Ben Gurion's proclamations and the ensuing Knesset vote of 24 January 1950, Jerusalem was divided between Israel and Jordan, and thus the proclamation only applied to West Jerusalem.

In July 1980 Israel passed the Jerusalem Law as Basic Law. The law declared Jerusalem the "complete and united" capital of Israel. The Jerusalem Law was condemned by the international community, which did not recognise Jerusalem as the capital of Israel. The United Nations Security Council passed Resolution 478 on 20 August 1980, which declared that the Jerusalem Law is "a violation of international law", is "null and void and must be rescinded forthwith". Member states were called upon to withdraw their diplomatic representation from Jerusalem.

Following the resolution, 22 of the 24 countries that previously had their embassy in (West) Jerusalem relocated them in Tel Aviv, where many embassies already resided prior to Resolution 478. Costa Rica and El Salvador followed in 2006. There are five embassies—United States, Guatemala, Honduras, Papua New Guinea and Kosovo—and two consulates located within the city limits of Jerusalem. Paraguay maintains an embassy in the Jerusalem District town of Mevaseret Zion, in addition to Bolivia whose embassy is now closed. There are a number of consulates-general located in Jerusalem, which work primarily either with Israel, or the Palestinian authorities.

In 1995 the United States Congress passed the Jerusalem Embassy Act, which required, subject to conditions, that its embassy be moved from Tel Aviv to Jerusalem. On 6 December 2017 the US president, Donald Trump, officially recognised Jerusalem as Israel's capital and announced his intention to move the American embassy to Jerusalem, reversing decades of United States policy on the issue. The move was criticised by many nations. A resolution condemning the US decision was supported by all the 14 other members of the UN Security Council, but was vetoed by the US on 18 December 2017. A subsequent resolution condemning the US decision was passed in the United Nations General Assembly. On 14 May 2018 the United States officially opened its embassy in Jerusalem, transforming its Tel Aviv location into a consulate. Due to the general lack of international recognition of Jerusalem as Israel's capital, some non-Israeli media outlets use Tel Aviv as a metonym for Israel.

In December 2017, US President Donald Trump made the decision to acknowledge Jerusalem as the capital of Israel and relocate the US embassy from Tel Aviv to that city. This decision faced significant opposition, particularly from leaders within the Arab and Muslim communities. The Palestinians assert that East Jerusalem should serve as the capital of their future state, and its status ought to be resolved through peace negotiations as outlined in the 1993 Israeli-Palestinian peace accords. Palestinian President Mahmoud Abbas remarked that Trump's action effectively negated the United States' position as a mediator in the peace process. Ismail Haniyeh, the head of the Islamist Hamas movement, urged for a new "intifada," or uprising. Turkish President Recep Tayyip Erdogan criticised the decision, stating it would "place the region in a ring of fire." Saudi Arabia's King Salman described it as "a clear provocation to Muslims globally." Egyptian President Abdel Fattah al-Sisi indicated that this decision would exacerbate the situation in the region. Iran warned that the decision would incite a "new intifada," labelling it a blatant infringement of international resolutions.

In April 2017 the Russian Ministry of Foreign Affairs announced it viewed Western Jerusalem as Israel's capital in the context of UN-approved principles which include the status of East Jerusalem as the capital of the future Palestinian state. On 15 December 2018 the Australian government officially recognised West Jerusalem as Israel's capital, but said their embassy in Tel Aviv would stay until a two-state resolution was settled. The decision was reversed in October 2022.

==== Government precinct and national institutions ====
The Kiryat HaLeom (national precinct) project is intended to house most government agencies and national cultural institutions. They are located in the Kiryat HaMemshala (government complex) in the Givat Ram neighbourhood. Some government buildings are located in Kiryat Menachem Begin. The city is home to the Knesset, the Supreme Court, the Bank of Israel, the National Headquarters of the Israel Police, the official residences of the president and the prime minister, the Cabinet, and all ministries except for the Ministry of Defense (which is located in central Tel Aviv's HaKirya district) and the Ministry of Agriculture and Rural Development (which is located in Rishon LeZion, in the wider Tel Aviv metropolitan area, near Beit Dagan).

==== Israeli settlements ====
Since its capture in 1967, the Israeli government has built 12 Israeli settlements in East Jerusalem, with a population amounting to 220,000 Israeli Jewish settlers as of 2019. The international community consider Israeli settlements to be illegal under international law.

=== Jerusalem as capital of Palestine ===
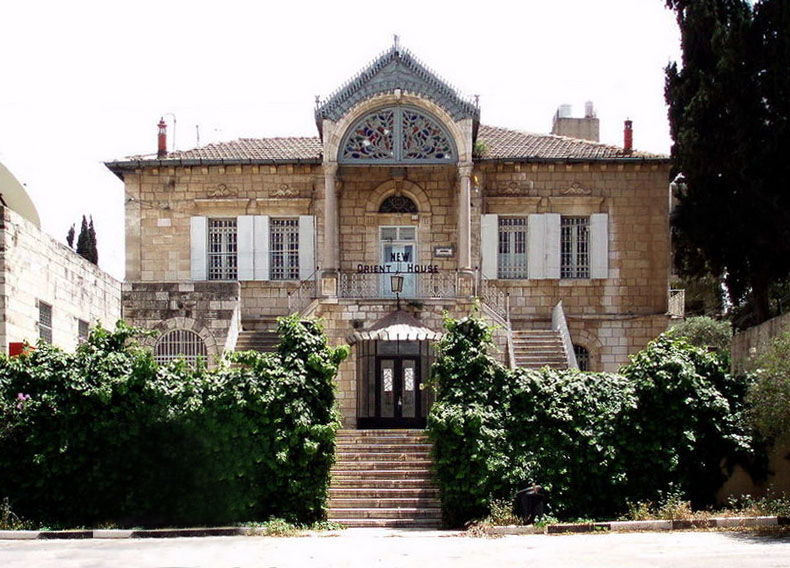
The Orient House, Jerusalem the former headquarters of the PLO

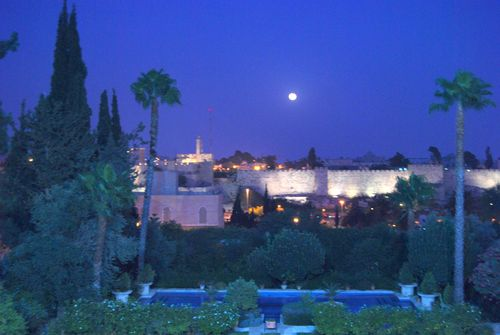
The Consulate General of France, Jerusalem

The Palestinian National Authority views East Jerusalem as occupied territory according to United Nations Security Council Resolution 242. The Palestinian Authority claims Jerusalem, including the Al-Aqsa Mosque Compound, as the capital of the State of Palestine, The PLO claims that West Jerusalem is also subject to permanent status negotiations. However, it has stated that it would be willing to consider alternative solutions, such as making Jerusalem an open city.

The PLO's position is that East Jerusalem, as defined by the pre-1967 municipal boundaries, shall be the capital of Palestine and West Jerusalem the capital of Israel, with each state enjoying full sovereignty over its respective part of the city and with its own municipality. A joint development council would be responsible for coordinated development. Orient House in East Jerusalem served as the headquarters of the PLO in the 1980s and 1990s. It was closed by Israel in 2001, two days after the Sbarro restaurant suicide bombing.

Some states, such as Russia and China, recognise the Palestinian state with East Jerusalem as its capital. United Nations General Assembly Resolution 58/292 affirmed that the Palestinian people have the right to sovereignty over East Jerusalem.

== Government ==
The Jerusalem City Council is a body of 31 elected members headed by the mayor, who serves a five-year term and appoints eight deputies. The former mayor of Jerusalem, Uri Lupolianski, was elected in 2003. In the November 2008 city elections, Nir Barkat was elected. In November 2018 Moshe Lion was elected mayor.

Apart from the mayor and his deputies, City Council members receive no salaries and work on a voluntary basis. The longest-serving Jerusalem mayor is Teddy Kollek, who spent 28 years—six consecutive terms—in office. Most of the meetings of the Jerusalem City Council are private, but each month, it holds a session that is open to the public. Within the city council, religious political parties form an especially powerful faction, accounting for the majority of its seats.

The headquarters of the Jerusalem Municipality and the mayor's office are at Safra Square (Kikar Safra) on Jaffa Road. The municipal complex, comprising two modern buildings and ten renovated historic buildings surrounding a large plaza, opened in 1993 when it moved from the old town hall building built by the Mandate authorities. The city falls under the Jerusalem District, with Jerusalem as the district's capital. 37% of the population is Palestinian, but in 2014 not more than 10% of tax revenues were allocated for them. In East Jerusalem, 52% of the land was excluded from development, 35% designated for Jewish settlements, and 13% for Palestinian use, almost all of which was already built upon.

=== Voting Patterns ===
In the 2022 election, 75 percent of voters in Jerusalem voted for the parties of the right-wing coalition led by Benjamin Netanyahu, while 20 percent voted for the parties of the center-left coalition led by Yair Lapid and 2 percent voted for the Arab parties. 42 percent of voters voted for the Haredi parties Shas or UTJ.

In the 2026 election, 68 percent of voters in Jerusalem voted for the parties of the right-wing coalition led by Benjamin Netanyahu, while 21 percent voted for the parties of the center-left coalition led by Gadi Eisenkot and 5 percent voted for the Arab parties. An additional 1.8 percent voted for the Reservists, and 1.9 percent voted for Amcha Yisrael. 37 percent of voters voted for the Haredi parties Shas or UTJ. Voter turnout increased 13 percent from the 2022 election.

== Geography ==
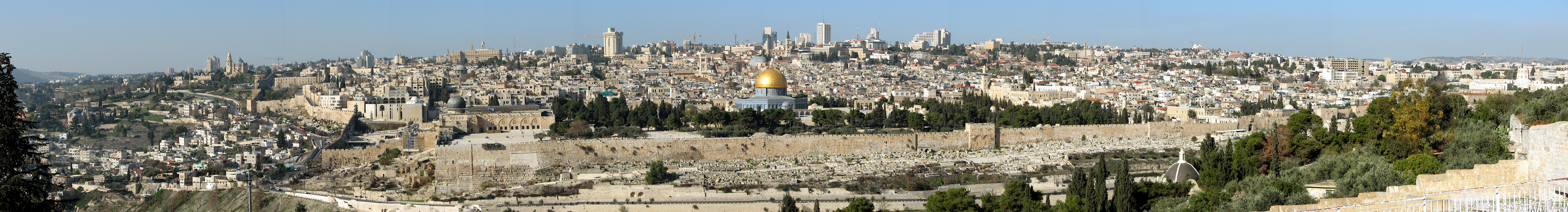
A panorama of the Temple Mount (Haram al-Sharif or Al-Aqsa compound), including Al-Aqsa Mosque, and Dome of the Rock, from the Mount of Olives

Jerusalem is situated on the southern spur of a plateau in the Judaean Mountains, which include the Mount of Olives (East) and Mount Scopus (North East). The elevation of the Old City is approximately 760 m (2,490 ft). The whole of Jerusalem is surrounded by valleys and dry riverbeds (wadis). The Kidron, Hinnom, and Tyropoeon Valleys intersect in an area just south of the Old City of Jerusalem. The Kidron Valley runs to the east of the Old City and separates the Mount of Olives from the city proper. Along the southern side of old Jerusalem is the Valley of Hinnom, a steep ravine associated in biblical eschatology with the concept of Gehenna or Hell.

The Tyropoeon Valley commenced in the northwest near the Damascus Gate, ran south-southeasterly through the centre of the Old City down to the Pool of Siloam, and divided the lower part into two hills, the Temple Mount to the east, and the rest of the city to the west, the lower and the upper cities described by Josephus. Today, this valley is hidden by debris that has accumulated over the centuries. In biblical times Jerusalem was surrounded by forests of almond, olive and pine trees. These were destroyed by centuries of warfare and neglect. Dating back to the Iron Age, farmers in the arid Jerusalem region built stone terraces along the slopes of hills to hold back the soil and allow for concentrated farming; these terraces are still very much in evidence in the Jerusalem landscape.

Water supply has always been a major problem in Jerusalem, as attested to by the intricate network of ancient aqueducts, tunnels, pools and cisterns found in the city.

Jerusalem is 60 km (37 mi) east of Tel Aviv and the Mediterranean Sea. On the opposite side of the city, approximately 35 km (22 mi) away, is the Dead Sea, the lowest body of water on Earth. Neighbouring cities and towns include Bethlehem and Beit Jala to the south, Abu Dis and Ma'ale Adumim to the east, Mevaseret Zion to the west, and Ramallah and Giv'at Ze'ev to the north.

Mount Herzl, at the western side of the city near the Jerusalem Forest, serves as the national cemetery of Israel. The body of Theodor Herzl, the cemetery's namesake and the visionary behind the Zionist movement that led to the establishment of the State of Israel, was disinterred from a cemetery in Vienna, flown to Israel and buried at the site on August 17, 1949, before the formal opening of the cemetery three months later.

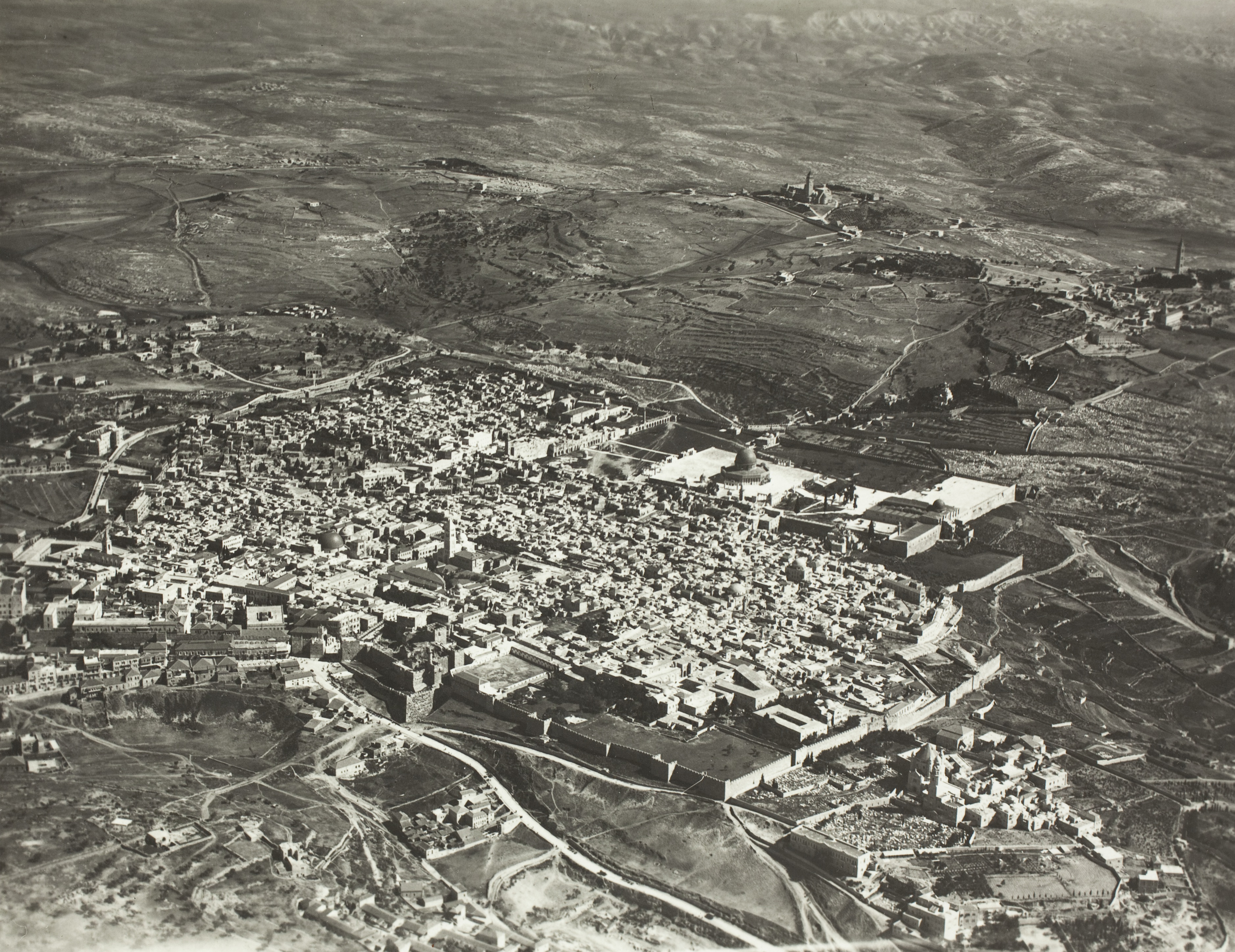
Aerial view of Jerusalem, 1918

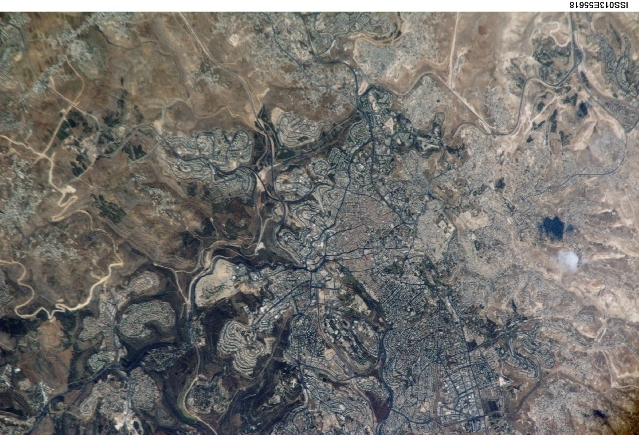
Astronauts' view of Jerusalem

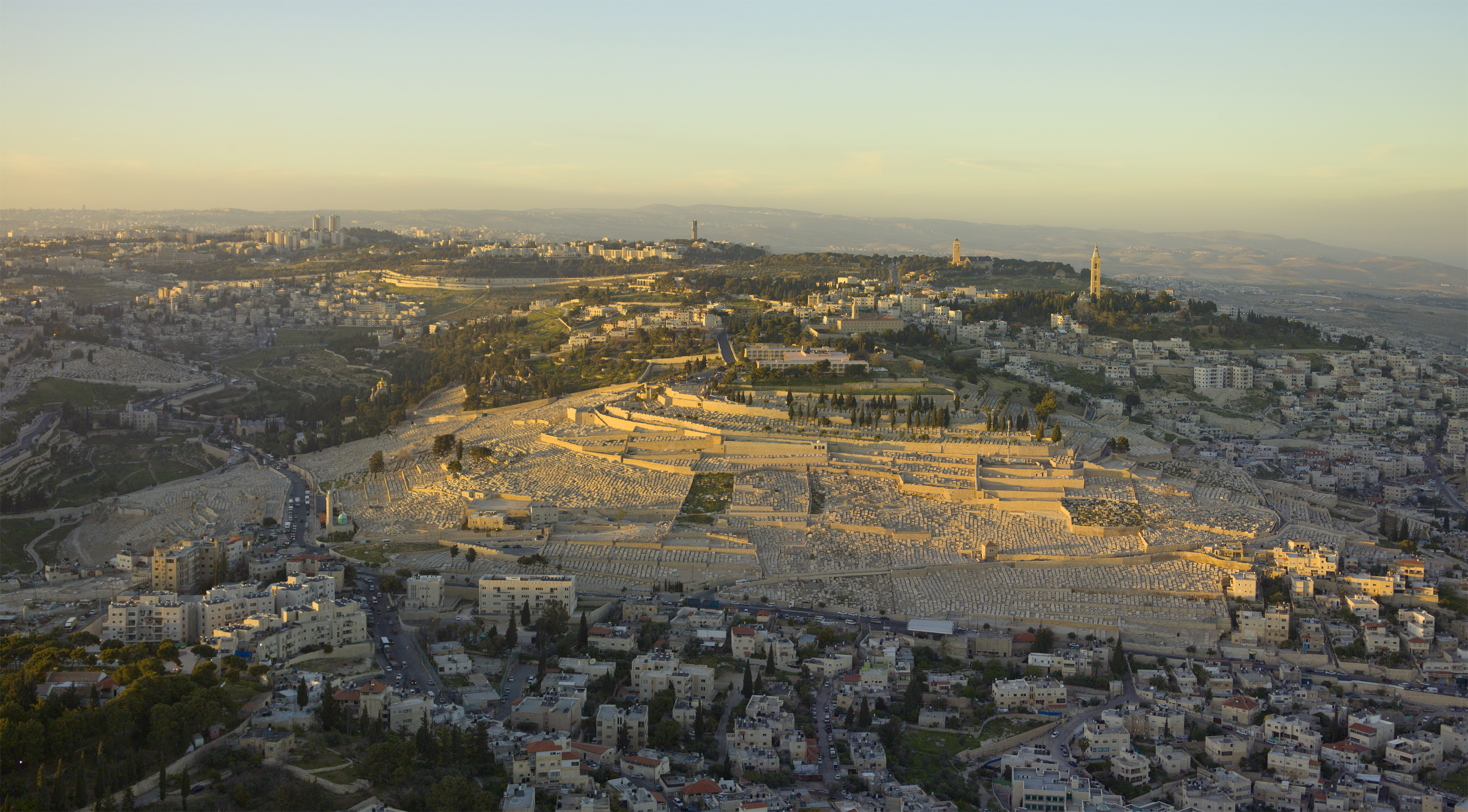
Sunset aerial photograph of the Mount of Olives

=== Climate ===
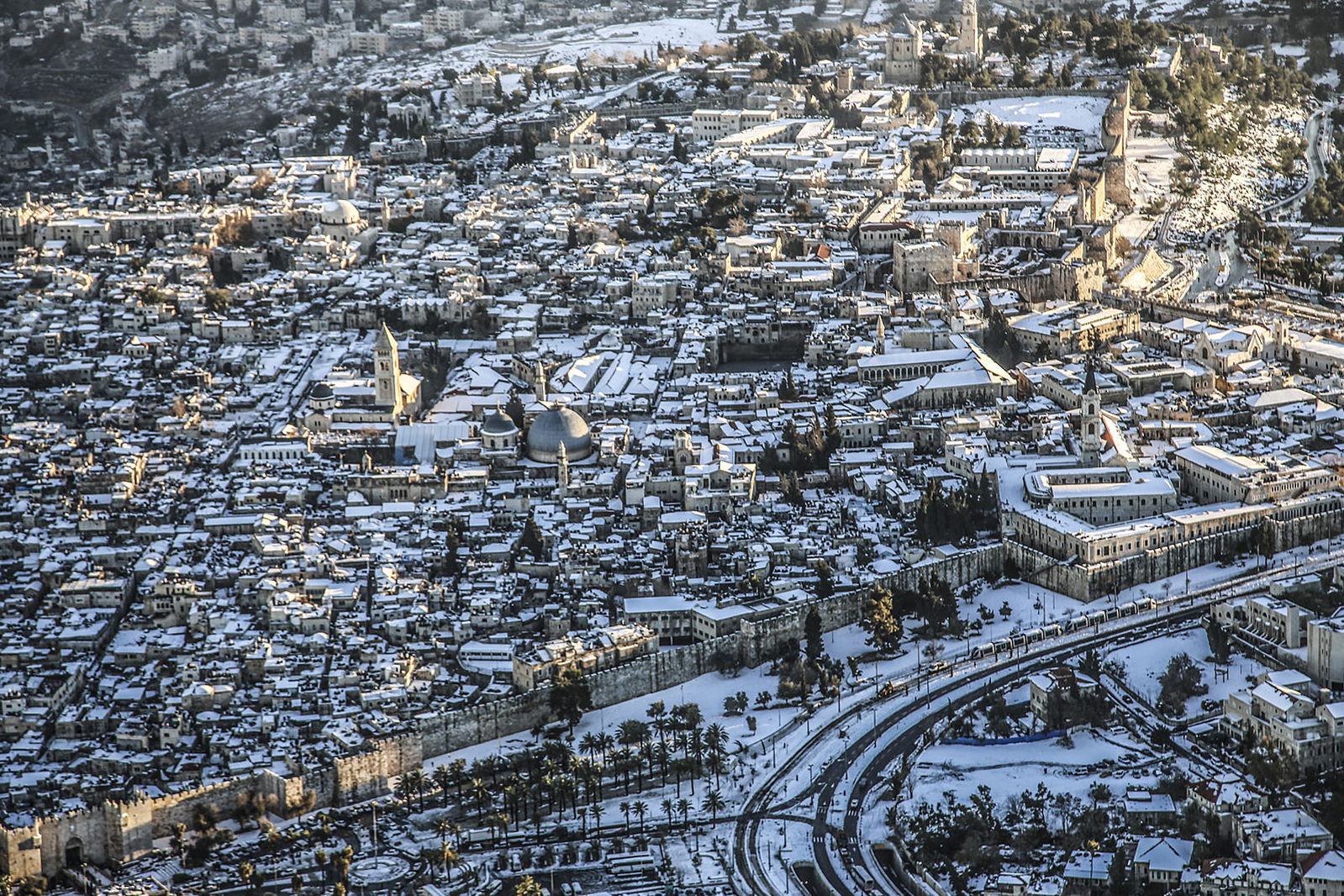
Snow visible on roofs in the Old City of Jerusalem

The city is characterised by a hot-summer Mediterranean climate (Köppen: Csa), with hot, dry summers, and mild, wet winters. Snow flurries usually occur once or twice a winter, although the city experiences heavy snowfall every three to four years, on average, with short-lived accumulation.

January is the coldest month of the year, with an average temperature of 9.1 °C (48.4 °F); July and August are the hottest months, with an average temperature of 24.2 °C (75.6 °F), and the summer months are usually rainless. The average annual precipitation is around 537 mm (21 in), with rain occurring almost entirely between October and May. Snowfall is rare, and large snowfalls are even more rare. Jerusalem received over 30 cm (12 in) of snow on 13 December 2013, which nearly paralysed the city. A day in Jerusalem has on average, 9.3 sunshine hours. With summers averaging similar temperatures as the coastline, the maritime influence from the Mediterranean Sea is strong, in particular given that Jerusalem is located on a similar latitude as scorching hot deserts not far to its east.

The highest recorded temperature in Jerusalem was 44.4 °C (111.9 °F) on 28 and 30 August 1881, and the lowest temperature recorded was −6.7 °C (19.9 °F) on 25 January 1907.

Most of the air pollution in Jerusalem comes from vehicular traffic. Many main streets in Jerusalem were not built to accommodate such a large volume of traffic, leading to traffic congestion and more carbon monoxide released into the air. Industrial pollution inside the city is sparse, but emissions from factories on the Israeli Mediterranean coast can travel eastward and settle over the city.

Climate data for Jerusalem (1991–2020 normals)
Month	Jan	Feb	Mar	Apr	May	Jun	Jul	Aug	Sep	Oct	Nov	Dec	Year
Record high °C (°F)	24.4 (75.9)	27.5 (81.5)	32.7 (90.9)	35.6 (96.1)	38.6 (101.5)	38.4 (101.1)	40.6 (105.1)	44.4 (111.9)	42.7 (108.9)	36.5 (97.7)	32.6 (90.7)	28.5 (83.3)	44.4 (111.9)
Mean daily maximum °C (°F)	12.7 (54.9)	14.0 (57.2)	17.4 (63.3)	22.0 (71.6)	26.2 (79.2)	28.6 (83.5)	30.0 (86.0)	30.3 (86.5)	28.9 (84.0)	25.9 (78.6)	19.9 (67.8)	14.9 (58.8)	22.6 (72.6)
Daily mean °C (°F)	9.8 (49.6)	10.7 (51.3)	13.4 (56.1)	17.3 (63.1)	21.2 (70.2)	23.5 (74.3)	25.0 (77.0)	25.3 (77.5)	24.0 (75.2)	21.6 (70.9)	16.4 (61.5)	11.9 (53.4)	18.3 (65.0)
Mean daily minimum °C (°F)	6.7 (44.1)	7.3 (45.1)	9.5 (49.1)	12.5 (54.5)	16.2 (61.2)	18.3 (64.9)	20.0 (68.0)	20.2 (68.4)	19.1 (66.4)	17.3 (63.1)	12.9 (55.2)	8.8 (47.8)	14.1 (57.3)
Record low °C (°F)	−6.7 (19.9)	−2.5 (27.5)	−0.3 (31.5)	0.8 (33.4)	7.6 (45.7)	11.0 (51.8)	14.6 (58.3)	15.5 (59.9)	13.2 (55.8)	9.8 (49.6)	1.8 (35.2)	−0.4 (31.3)	−6.7 (19.9)
Average precipitation mm (inches)	136.8 (5.39)	117.9 (4.64)	67.2 (2.65)	21.8 (0.86)	7.1 (0.28)	0.3 (0.01)	0.0 (0.0)	0.0 (0.0)	0.7 (0.03)	10.3 (0.41)	51.1 (2.01)	112.3 (4.42)	525.5 (20.7)
Average precipitation days (≥ 1 mm)	9.2	8.5	6.2	2.4	0.8	0.0	0.0	0.0	0.2	1.9	4.7	7.7	41.6
Average relative humidity (%)	61	59	52	39	35	37	40	40	40	42	48	56	46
Mean monthly sunshine hours	192.9	243.6	226.3	266.6	331.7	381.0	384.4	365.8	309.0	275.9	228.0	192.2	3,397.4
Source 1: Israel Meteorological Service (records until 1990)
Source 2: NOAA (normal values & records, 1991–2020) (sun, 1961–1990)

== Demographics ==
=== Demographic history ===
Jerusalem's population size and composition have shifted many times over its 5,000-year history. Since the 19th century, the Old City of Jerusalem has been divided into Jewish, Muslim, Christian and Armenian quarters. Matthew Teller writes that this convention may have originated in the 1841 British Royal Engineers map of Jerusalem, or at least the Rev. George Williams' subsequent labelling of it.

Most population data before 1905 are based on estimates, often from foreign travellers or organisations, since previous census data usually covered wider areas such as the Jerusalem District. These estimates suggest that since the end of the Crusades, Muslims formed the largest group in Jerusalem until the mid-nineteenth century.

Between 1838 and 1876 a number of estimates exist which conflict as to whether Jews or Muslims were the largest group during this period, and between 1882 and 1922 estimates conflict as to exactly when Jews became an absolute majority of the population.

=== Current demographics ===
Jerusalem population pyramid in 2021

Approximate 2021 population for East/West Jerusalem (UN-recognised 1967 border)
West or East (1967 borders)	Total	Jews and others	Jews and others %	Approx. # of Ultra- Orthodox	Ultra- Orthodox as % of "Jews and Others"	Arabs/ Pale- stinians	Pale- stinian %
East Jerusalem	611,370	240,831	39.4%	111,121	46.1%	370,532	60.6%
West Jerusalem	354,840	349,734	98.6%	166,688	47.7%	5,088	1.4%
Total Jerusalem	966,210	590,565	61%	277,809	47%	375,620	39%
Some sub-quarters straddle the Green Line and in those cases the sub-quarter is assigned to the sector (East or West) into which most of the area falls. Source: Statistical Yearbook of Jerusalem, 2021. Totals do not sum exactly due to the presentation of some ethnoreligious groups as percentages of totals.

In December 2007 Jerusalem had a population of 747,600—63.7% were Jewish, 33.1% Muslim, and 2% Christian.

According to a study published in 2000, the percentage of Jews in the city's population had been decreasing; this was attributed to a higher Muslim birth rate, and Jewish residents leaving. The study also found that about nine percent of the Old City's 32,488 people were Jews. Of the Jewish population, 200,000 live in East Jerusalem settlements which are considered illegal under international law.

In 2005, 2,850 new immigrants settled in Jerusalem, mostly from the United States, France and the former Soviet Union. In terms of the local population, the number of outgoing residents exceeds the number of incoming residents. In 2005, 16,000 left Jerusalem and only 10,000 moved in. Nevertheless, the population of Jerusalem continues to rise due to the high birth rate, especially in the Haredi Jewish and Arab communities. Consequently, the total fertility rate in Jerusalem (4.02) is higher than in Tel Aviv (1.98) and well above the national average of 2.90. The average size of Jerusalem's 180,000 households is 3.8 people.

In 2005 the total population grew by 13,000 (1.8%)—similar to the Israeli national average, but the religious and ethnic composition is shifting. While 31% of the Jewish population is made up of children below the age fifteen, the figure for the Arab population is 42%.

In 1967 Jews accounted for 74% of the population, while the figure for 2006 is down by 9%. Possible factors are the high cost of housing, fewer job opportunities and the increasingly religious character of the city, although proportionally, young Haredim are leaving in higher numbers. The percentage of secular Jews, or those who 'wear their faith lightly' is dropping, with some 20,000 leaving the city over the past seven years (2012). They now number 31% of the population, the same percentage as the rising Haredi population.

In 2010, 61% of all Jewish children in Jerusalem studied in Haredi (Ultra-Orthodox) schools. This correlates with the high number of children in Haredi families.

While some secular Jews leave Jerusalem for its relative lack of development and religious and political tensions, Jerusalem-born Palestinians cannot leave Jerusalem, or they lose their right to live in the city. Palestinians with a "Jerusalem resident status" are entitled to the subsidised healthcare and social security benefits Israel provides to its citizens, and have the right to vote in municipal elections, but not to be voted in municipal elections, or to vote in national elections. Arabs in Jerusalem can send their children to Israeli-run schools, although not every neighbourhood has one, and universities. Israeli doctors and highly regarded hospitals such as Hadassah Medical Centre are available to residents.

Demographics and the Jewish-Arab population divide play a major role in the dispute over Jerusalem. In 1998, the Jerusalem Development Authority expanded city limits to the west to include more areas heavily populated with Jews.

Within the past few years, there has been a steady increase in the Jewish birthrate and a steady decrease in the Arab birthrate. In May 2012 it was reported that the Jewish birthrate had overtaken the Arab birthrate. The city's birthrate stands about 4.2 children per Jewish family and 3.9 children per Arab family. In addition, increasing numbers of Jewish immigrants chose to settle in Jerusalem. In the last few years, thousands of Palestinians have moved to previously fully Jewish neighbourhoods of East Jerusalem, built after the 1967 Six-Day War. In 2007, 1,300 Palestinians lived in the previously exclusively Jewish neighbourhood of Pisgat Ze'ev and constituted 3% of the population in Neve Ya'akov. In the French Hill neighbourhood Palestinians today constitute one-sixth of the overall population.

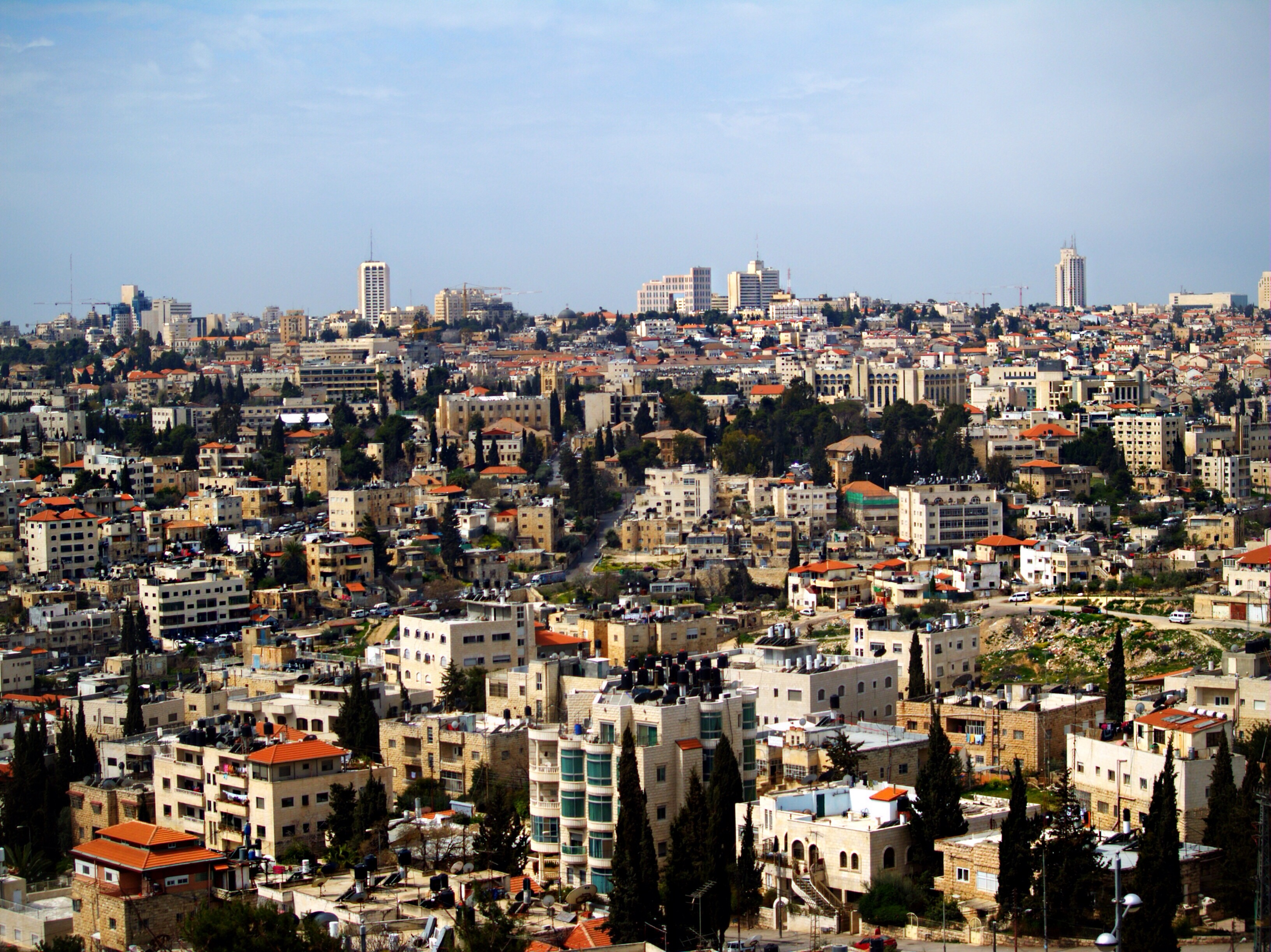
Sheikh Jarrah, a predominantly Arab neighbourhood on the road to Mount Scopus

At the end of 2008 the population of East Jerusalem was 456,300, comprising 60% of Jerusalem's residents. Of these 195,500 (43%) were Jews, (comprising 40% of the Jewish population of Jerusalem as a whole), and 260,800 (57%) were Muslim (comprising 98% of the Muslim population of Jerusalem). In 2008 the Palestinian Central Bureau of Statistics reported the number of Palestinians living in East Jerusalem was 208,000 according to a recently completed census.

Jerusalem's Jewish population is overwhelmingly religious. Only 18% of Jewish residents are secular. In addition, Haredi Jews comprise 35% of the city's adult Jewish population. In a phenomenon seen rarely around the world, the percentage of Jewish women who work, 81%, exceeds the percentage of Jewish men who work, 70%.

Jerusalem had a population of 804,400 in 2011, of which Jews comprised 499,400 (62.1%), Muslims 281,100 (34.9%), Christians 14,700 (1.8%), and 9,000 (1.1%) were not classified by religion.

Jerusalem had a population of 882,700 in 2016, of which Jews comprised 536,600 (60.8%), Muslims 319,800 (36.2%), Christians 15,800 (1.8%), and 10,300 unclassified (1.2%).

Jerusalem had a population of 951,100 in 2020, of which Jews comprised 570,100 (59.9%), Muslims 353.800 (37.2%), Christians 16.300 (1.7%), and 10,800 unclassified (1.1%).

In 2022, research from the Jerusalem Institute for Policy Research reported that the city's demographic makeup was 39% Arab, 28% Haredi Jews, and 33% non-Haredi Jews.

=== Urban planning issues ===
Critics of efforts to promote a Jewish majority in Jerusalem say that government planning policies are motivated by demographic considerations and seek to limit Arab construction while promoting Jewish construction. According to a World Bank report, the number of recorded building violations between 1996 and 2000 was four and half times higher in Jewish neighbourhoods but four times fewer demolition orders were issued in West Jerusalem than in East Jerusalem; Arabs in Jerusalem were less likely to receive construction permits than Jews, and "the authorities are much more likely to take action against Palestinian violators" than Jewish violators of the permit process. In recent years, private Jewish foundations have received permission from the government to develop projects on disputed lands, such as the City of David archaeological site in the 60% Arab neighbourhood of Silwan (adjacent to the Old City), and the Museum of Tolerance on Mamilla Cemetery (adjacent to Zion Square).

According to Peace Now, approvals for building in Israeli settlements in East Jerusalem expanded by 60% under Donald Trump's first US presidency. Since 1991, Palestinians, who make up the majority of the residents in East Jerusalem, have only received 30% of the building permits.

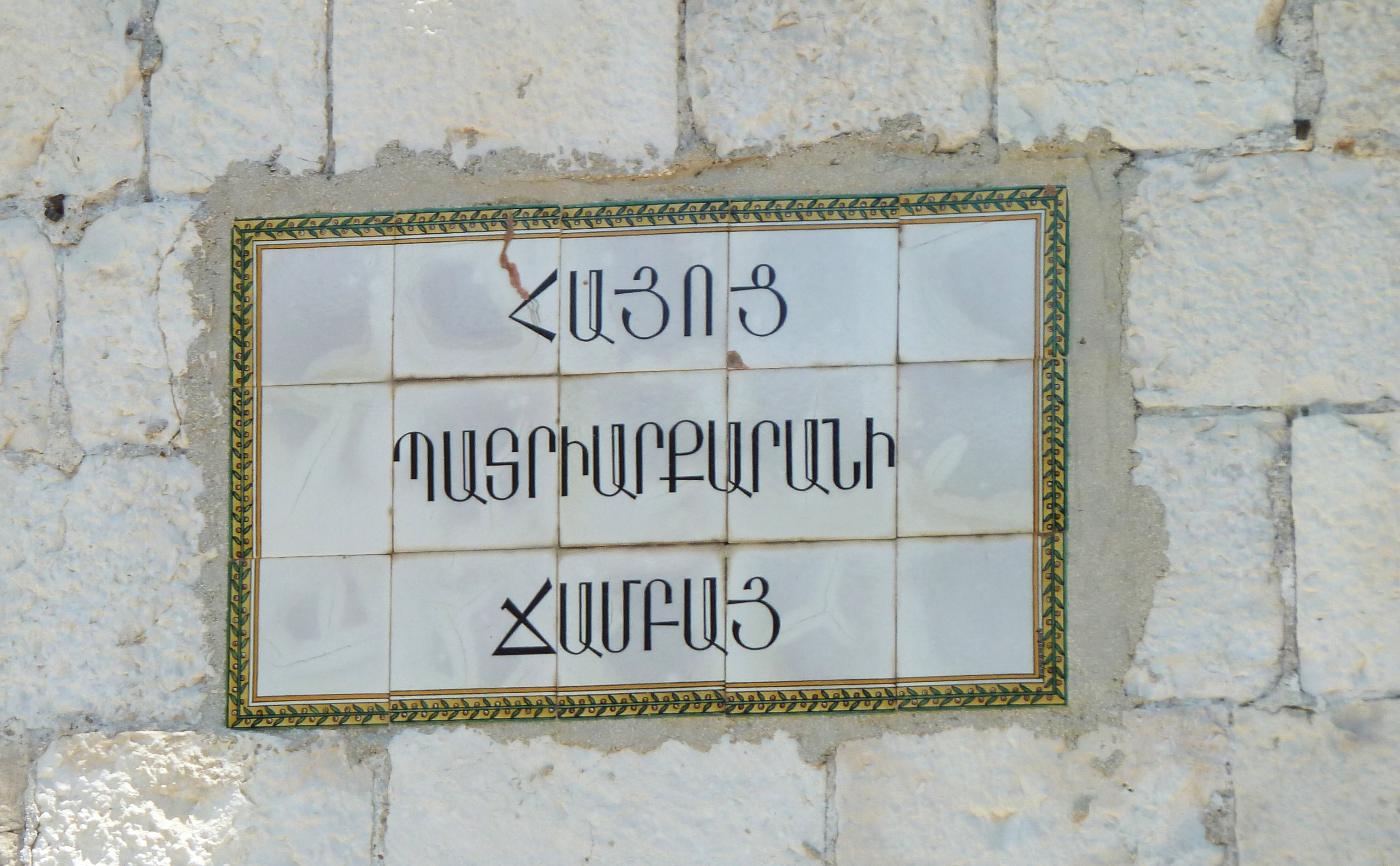
Sign in Armenian in the Armenian Quarter

== Religious significance ==
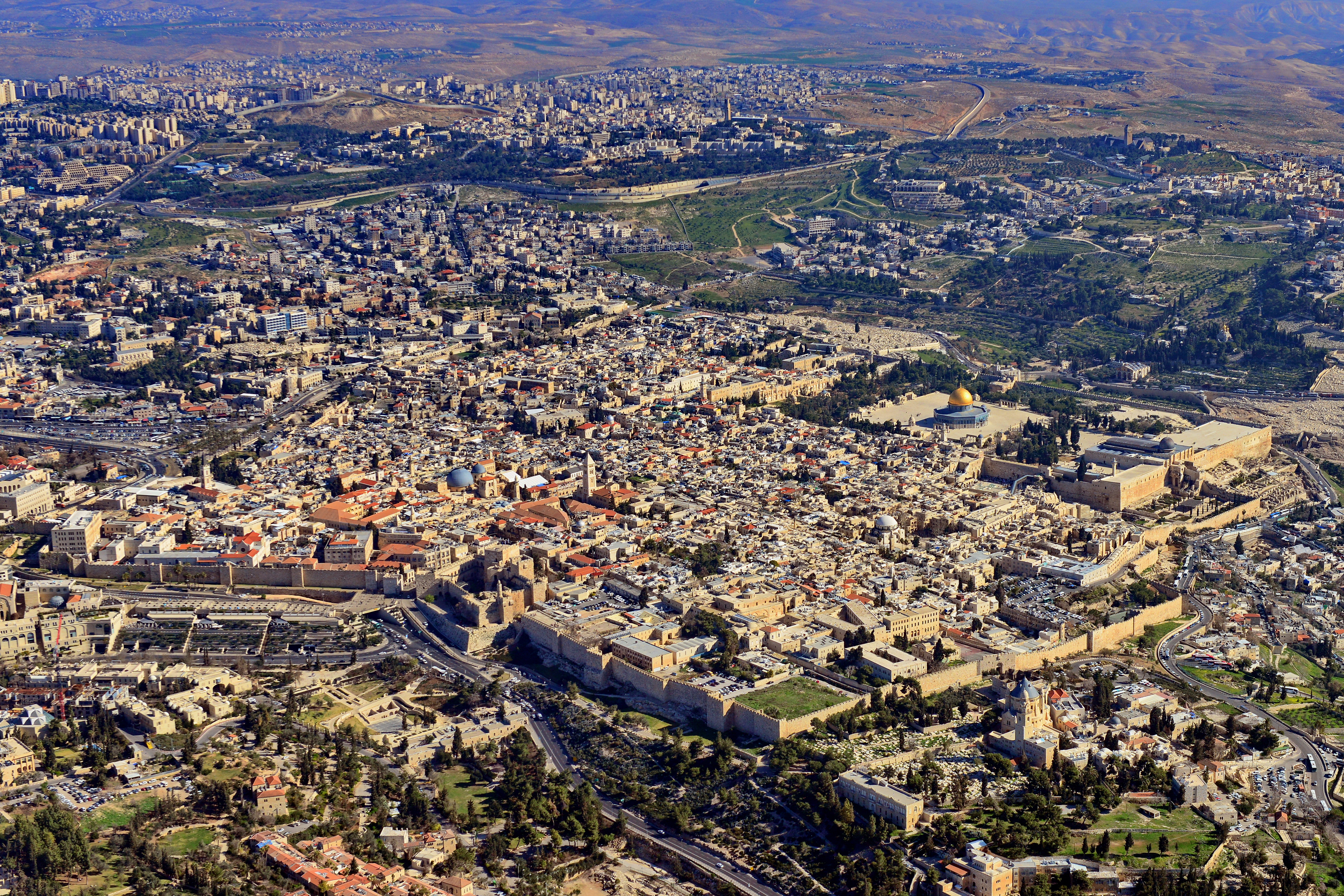
The Old City is home to many sites of seminal religious importance for the three major Abrahamic religions—Judaism, Christianity, and Islam.

Jerusalem has been sacred to Judaism for roughly 3000 years, to Christianity for around 2000 years, and to Islam for approximately 1400 years. The 2000 Statistical Yearbook of Jerusalem lists 1204 synagogues, 158 churches, and 73 mosques within the city. Despite efforts to maintain peaceful religious coexistence, some sites, such as the Temple Mount, have been a continuous source of friction and controversy. The Temple Mount is the holiest spot in Judaism and the third holiest site in Islam. Jews venerate it as the site of the two former Temples and Muslims believe that Muhammad was transported from the Great Mosque of Mecca to this location during the Night Journey.

=== Judaism ===
Jerusalem has been the holiest city in Judaism and the ancestral and spiritual homeland of the Jewish people since King David proclaimed it his capital in the 10th century BCE. Without counting its other names, Jerusalem appears in the Hebrew Bible 669 times. The first five books of the Torah (Pentateuch), only mentions Moriah, but in the rest of the Bible, the city is mentioned explicitly. The Temple Mount, which was the site of Solomon's Temple and the Second Temple, is the holiest site in Judaism and the place Jews throughout the world turn towards during prayer. The Western Wall, a remnant of the wall surrounding the Second Temple, attracts over 10 million visitors each year. Synagogues around the world are traditionally built with the Holy Ark facing Jerusalem, and Arks within Jerusalem face the Holy of Holies. As prescribed in the Mishnah and codified in the Shulchan Aruch, daily prayers are recited while facing towards Israel, Jerusalem and the Temple Mount. The Talmud cites 1 Kings 8 in ruling that the core daily prayers are recited facing towards Israel by those outside it, while those reciting the prayer in Israel face Jerusalem and those in Jerusalem face towards the site of the Holy of Holies on the Temple Mount. Many Jews located west of Jerusalem have "Mizrach" plaques hung on a wall of their homes to indicate the direction of prayer to the east. (Note: The Jewish injunction to pray toward Jerusalem comes in the Orach Chayim section of Shulchan Aruch (94:1)—"When one rises to pray anywhere in the Diaspora, he should face towards the Land of Israel, directing himself also toward Jerusalem, the Temple, and the Holy of Holies.") The words "L'Shana Haba'ah" (meaning "Next Year in Jerusalem") are traditionally recited at the conclusion of the Yom Kippur service and of the Passover Seder outside of Jerusalem. The passage first appears as part of the liturgy for Yom Kippur in the Machzor Vitry published in the 12th-13th centuries, and for Passover in the Birds' Head Haggadah published around 1300 and was attested a century later by Rabbi Isaac Tyrnau as an accepted component of the Seder. In the Amidah prayer, which is recited three times daily as the core element of Jewish religious service and whose structure and blessings were formulated to replace sacrificial rites following the destruction of the Second Temple, the fourteenth blessing pleads for God to re-establish the Davidic monarchy and return his Divine presence to a rebuilt Jerusalem. The third blessing of the Grace After Meals asks God to speedily rebuild the holy city of Jerusalem, in a text which the Babylonian Talmud ascribes to David and Solomon. The Three Weeks is an annual period of communal sorrow, which ends on the fast day of Tisha B'Av—described as "the saddest day in the Jewish calendar"—which is dedicated to remembering and mourning the destruction in Jerusalem of Solomon's Temple in 586 BCE and of the Second Temple in 70 CE. A tradition dating back to the Talmud (Bava Batra 60b) requires that a patch of wall in a new home near the front door and measuring approximately 18 by 18 inches (46 by 46 cm) be left unfinished or unpainted as a perpetual reminder and a sign of mourning for the destruction of the Temple.

==== Jerusalem remembered at weddings and mourning ====
Verses 5 and 6 of Psalm 137 and the words "If I forget thee O Jerusalem..." are customarily recited during a Jewish wedding ceremony shortly before breaking a glass as a symbolic act of mourning over the destruction of the Temple, even when at a time of greatest joy.

There are various customs as to what to say when taking leave of the mourner(s). Ashkenazi Jews recite a traditional phrase that wishes comfort to a mourner with a reassurance that they will eventually reconnect to the person who died, in the same way that God comforts the Jewish people for the destruction of the Second Temple nearly 2,000 years ago through the promise of its eventual rebuilding in the times of the Messiah. The visitor says to the mourner:

הַמָּקוֹם יְנַחֵם אֶתְכֶם בְּתוֹךְ שְׁאָר אֲבֵלֵי צִיּוֹן וִירוּשָׁלָיִם
Hamakom y'nachem etkhem b'tokh sha'ar avelei tziyon viyrushalayim:
"May The Omnipresent comfort you (pl.) among the mourners of Zion and Jerusalem"

=== Christianity ===
Jerusalem is generally considered the cradle of Christianity. Christianity reveres Jerusalem for its Old Testament history, and also for its significance in the life of Jesus. According to the New Testament, Jesus was brought to Jerusalem soon after his birth and later in his life cleansed the Second Temple. The Cenacle, believed to be the site of Jesus' Last Supper, is located on Mount Zion in the same building that houses the Tomb of King David. Another prominent Christian site in Jerusalem is Golgotha, the site of the crucifixion. The Gospel of John describes it as being located outside Jerusalem, but recent archaeological evidence suggests Golgotha is a short distance from the Old City walls, within the present-day confines of the city. The land occupied by the Church of the Holy Sepulchre is considered one of the top candidates for Golgotha and thus has been a Christian pilgrimage site for the past 2000 years. The Church of the Holy Sepulchre is generally considered the most important church in Christendom. It contains the two holiest sites in Christianity: the site where Jesus was crucified, and Jesus's empty tomb, where he is believed by Christians to have been buried and resurrected.

=== Islam ===
Jerusalem is the third-holiest city in Sunni Islam. Islamic tradition holds that for approximately a year, before it was permanently switched to the Kaaba in Mecca, the qibla (direction of prayer) for Muslims was Jerusalem. The city's lasting place in Islam, however, is primarily due to Muhammad's Night Journey (c. 620 CE). Muslims believe that Muhammad traveled in one night from the Great Mosque of Mecca to the Temple Mount in Jerusalem, and then ascended to Heaven to meet previous prophets of Islam. The first verse in the Qur'an's Surat al-Isra notes the destination of Muhammad's journey as al-masjid al-aqṣā ("the farthest place of prayer"). In the earliest days of Islam, this was understood as a reference to a site in the heavens, however, Post-Rashidun Islamic scholars understood it as relating to Jerusalem, and particularly to the site of the former Jewish Temple. The hadith, a collection of the sayings of Muhammad, mentions that the location of the Al-Aqsa Mosque (Al-Masjid Al-Aqsa) is in Jerusalem. According to Islamic tradition, the entire site on Temple Mount is Al-Masjid Al-Aqsa, also called Al-Aqsa or Al-Aqsa Mosque Compound, and not merely the mosque located at its southern end, which is currently named the Al-Aqsa Mosque or Qibli Mosque, The first erected congregational mosque in the Al-Aqsa Mosque compound have been built by the Rashidun Caliph Umar following was the conquest of Jerusalem in 637–38, The mosque was described by the pilgrim Arculf, who toured the Holy Land around 670 CE, as having a capacity of approximately three thousand worshippers. The first Umayyad monument to be built on the compound is the Dome of the Rock by Caliph Abd al-Malik between 685–691. He and his son Al-Walid (r. 705–715) have also rebuilt the congregational Qibli Mosque between 705–710.

Gallery
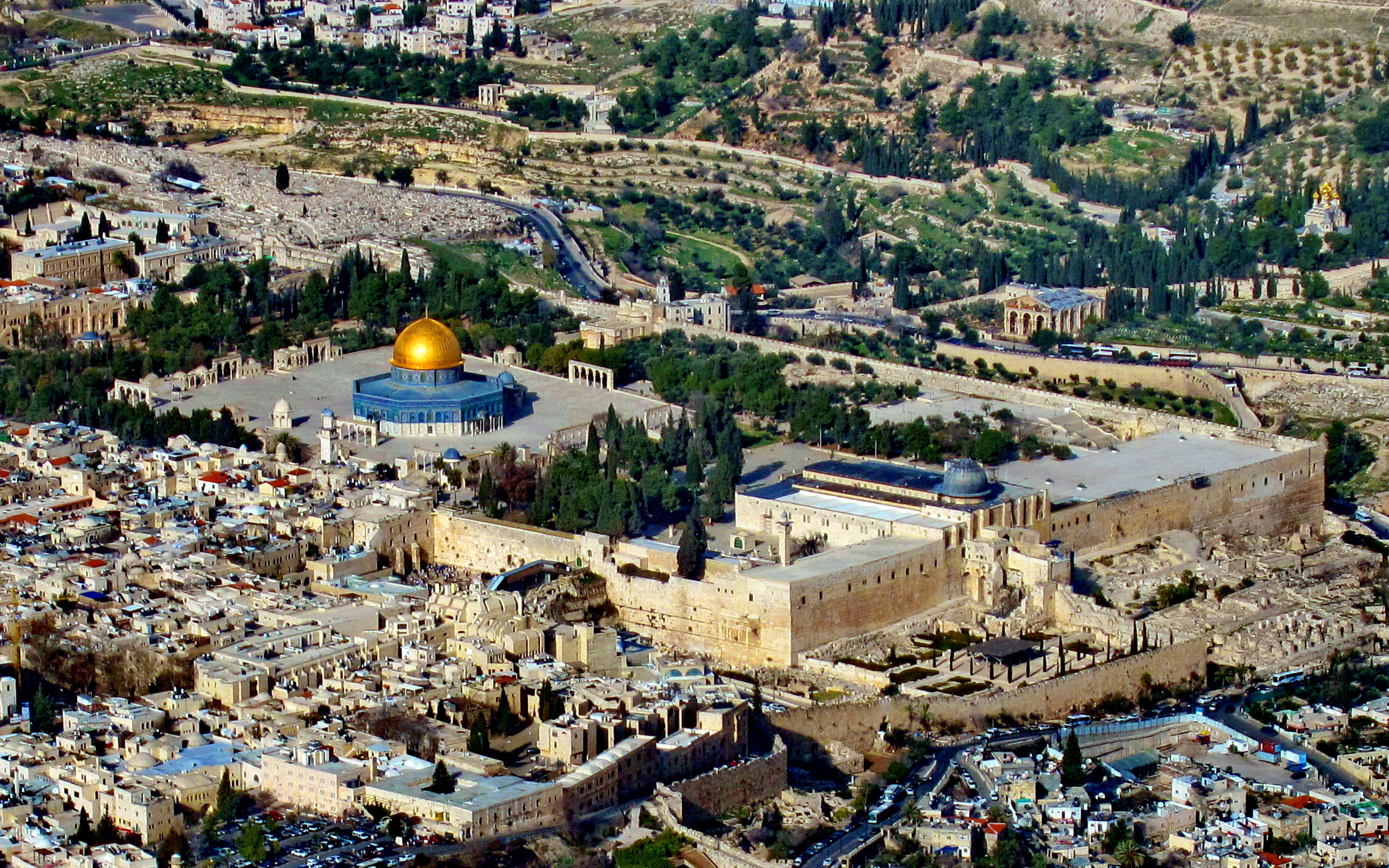
A view of the Al-Aqsa Mosque Compound, considered a holy place by Jews, Christians, and Muslims.

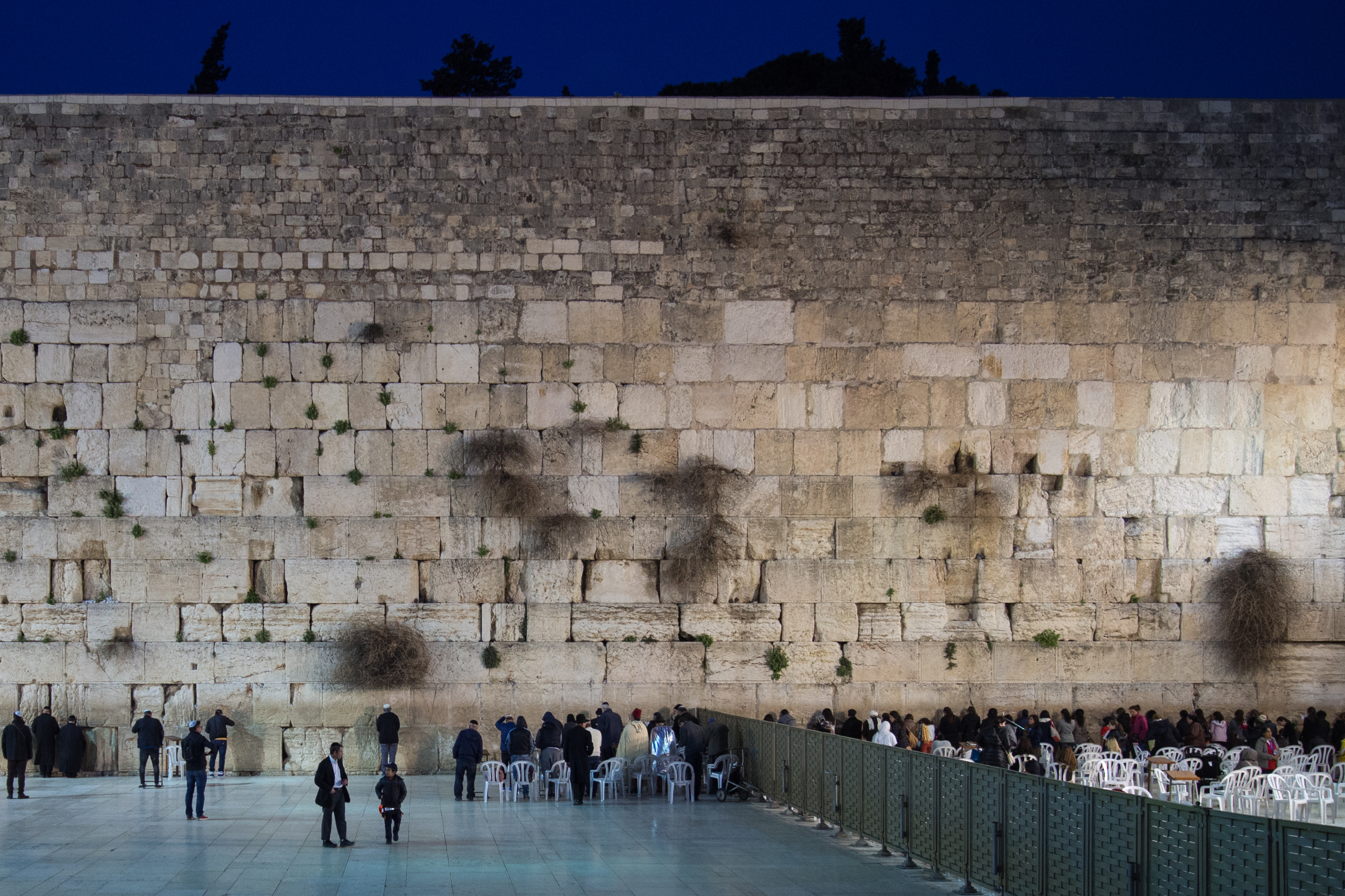
The Western Wall, also known as the Wailing Wall and the Kotel, is a remnant of the Second Temple and the holiest place where Jews are permitted to pray.

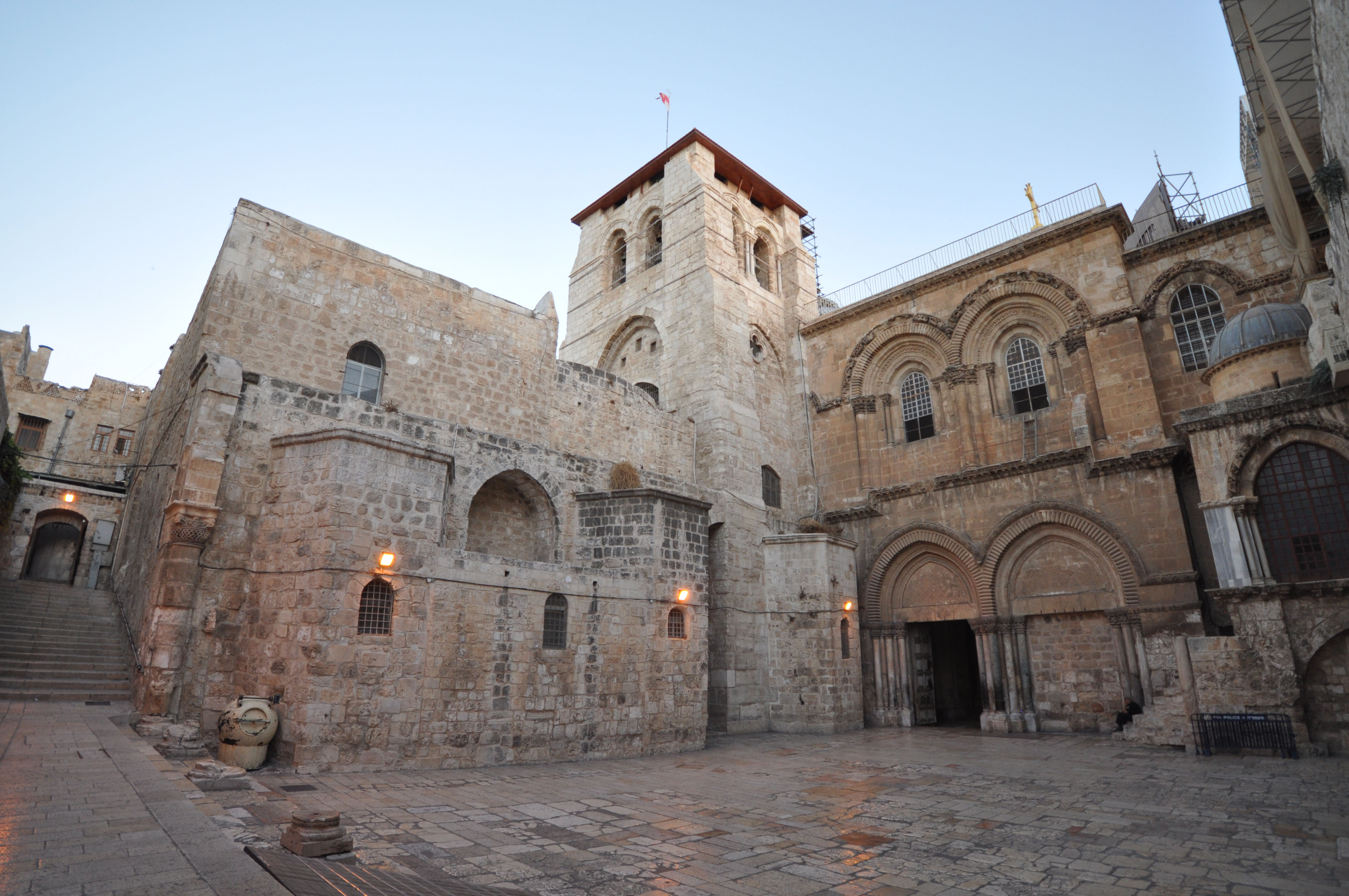
The Church of the Holy Sepulchre it's the holiest site in Christianity and it has been an important pilgrimage site for Christians since the 4th century.

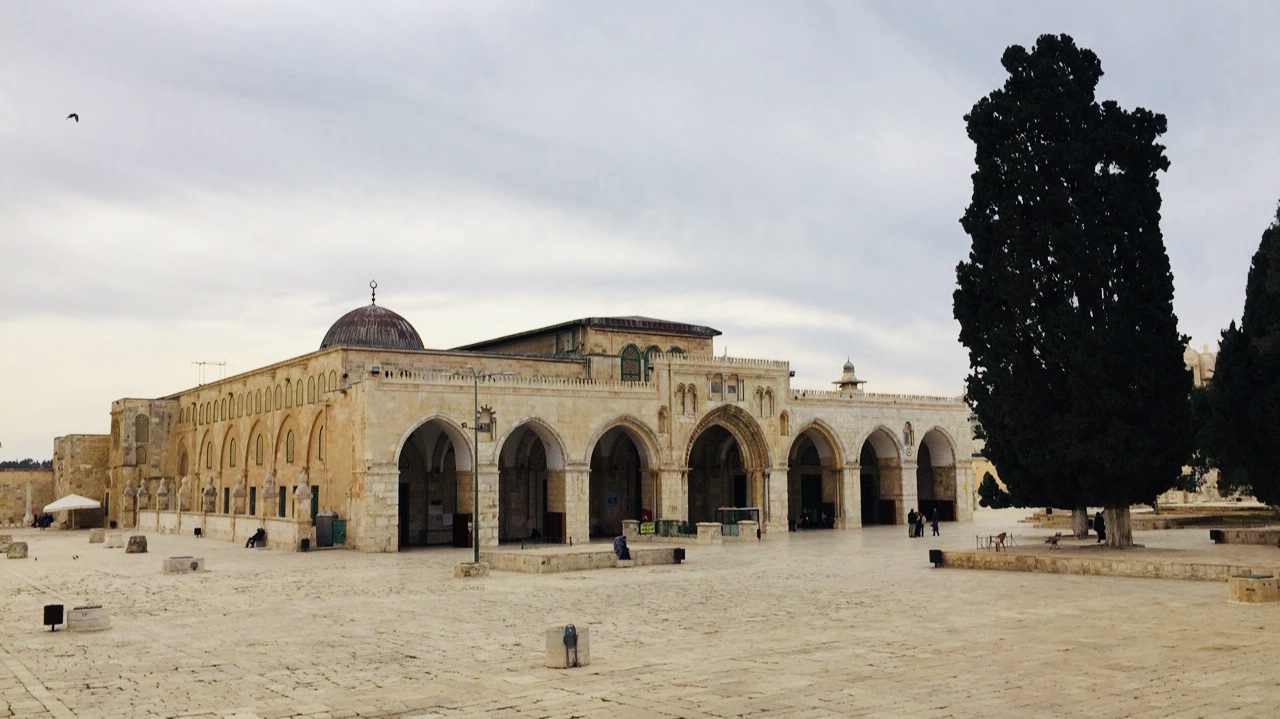
The Qibli (Al-Aqsa) Mosque, in Al-Aqsa Mosque Compound.

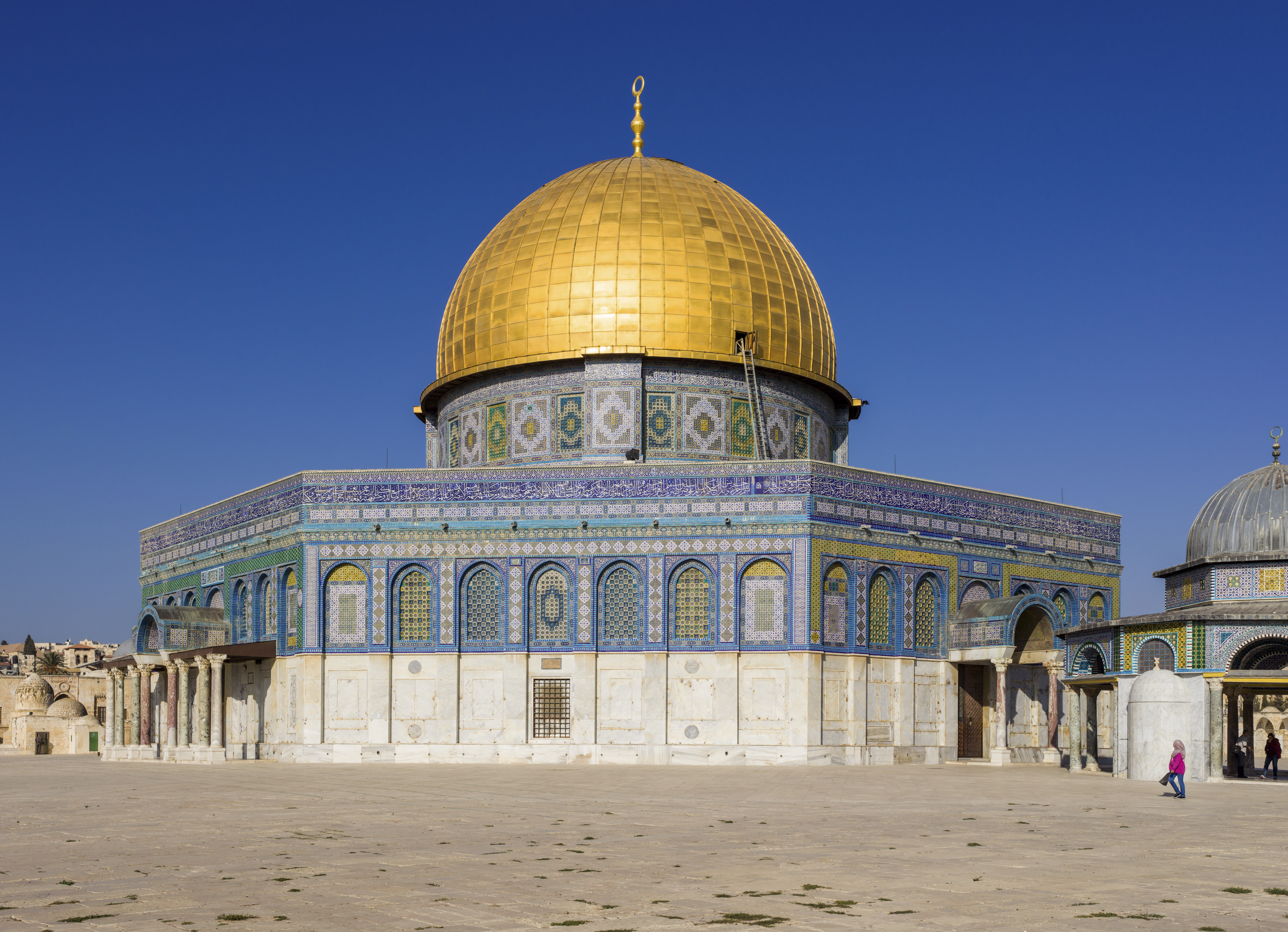
The Dome of the Rock, in Al-Aqsa Mosque Compound.

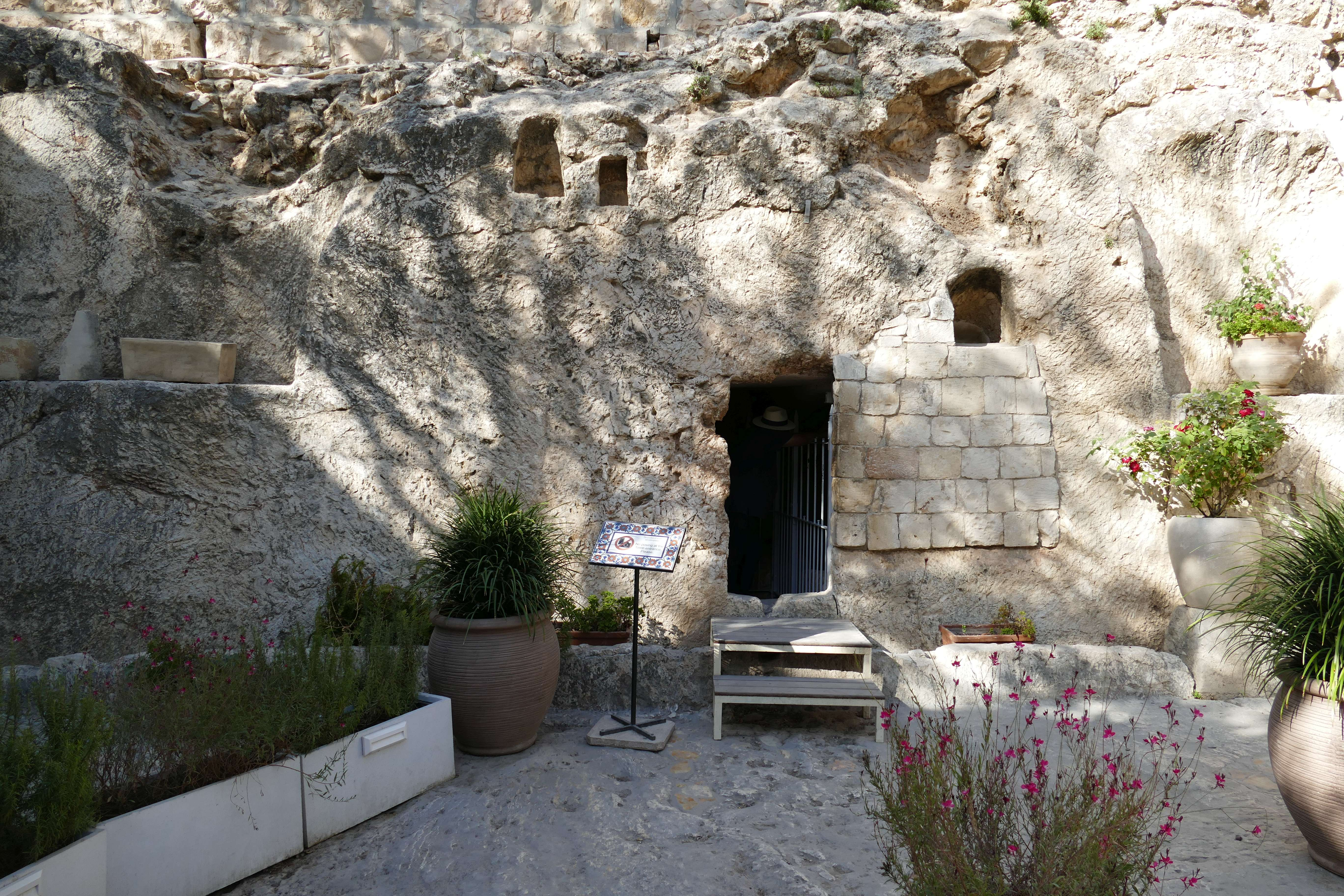
The Garden Tomb—a new holy site established by British Protestants in the 19th century.

== Economy ==
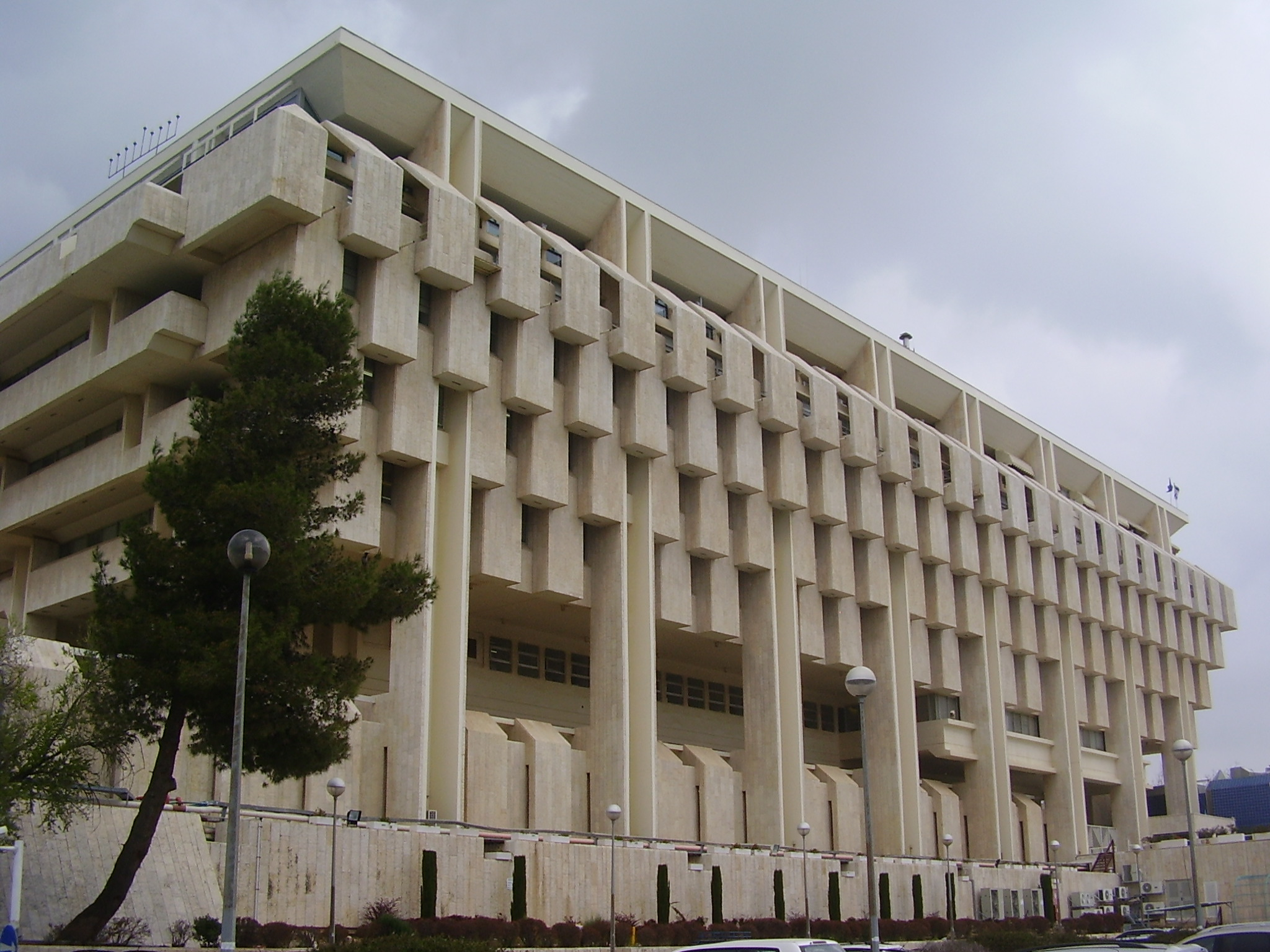
Bank of Israel

Historically, Jerusalem's economy was supported almost exclusively by religious pilgrims, as it was far from the major ports of Jaffa and Gaza. Jerusalem's religious and cultural landmarks today remain the top draw for foreign visitors, with the majority of tourists visiting the Western Wall and the Old City. In 2010, Jerusalem was named the top leisure travel city in Africa and the Middle East by Travel + Leisure magazine. In 2013, 75% of the 3.5 million tourists to Israel visited Jerusalem.

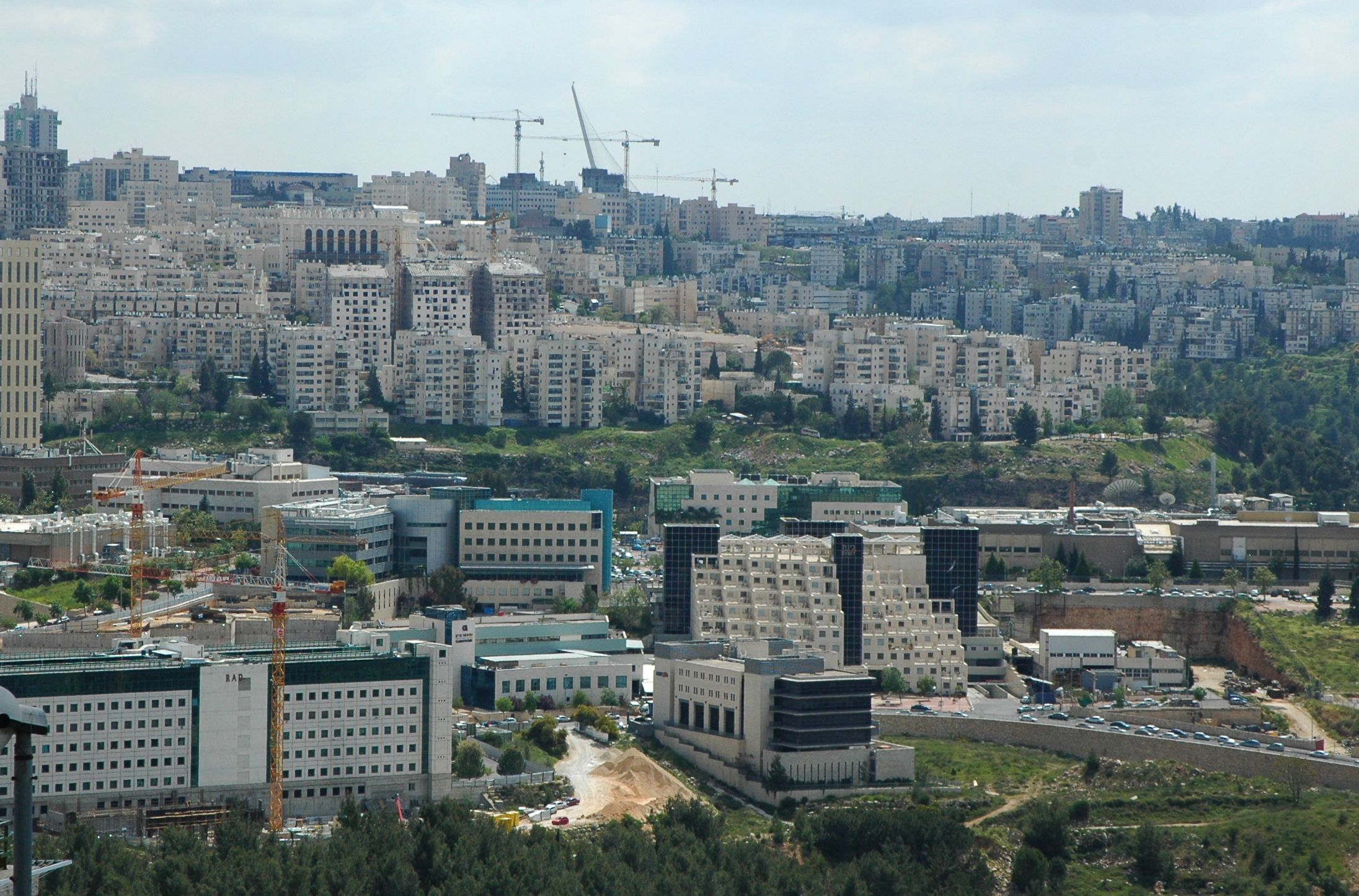
Har Hotzvim high-tech park

Since the establishment of the State of Israel, the national government has remained a major player in Jerusalem's economy. The government, centred in Jerusalem, generates a large number of jobs, and offers subsidies and incentives for new business initiatives and start-ups. Although Tel Aviv remains Israel's financial centre, a growing number of high tech companies are moving to Jerusalem, providing 12,000 jobs in 2006. Northern Jerusalem's Har Hotzvim industrial park and the Jerusalem Technology Park in south Jerusalem are home to large Research and Development centres of international tech companies, among them Intel, Cisco Systems, Teva Pharmaceutical Industries, IBM, Mobileye, Johnson & Johnson, Medtronic and more. In April 2015 Time magazine picked Jerusalem as one of the five emerging tech hubs in the world, proclaiming that "The city has become a flourishing centre for biomed, cleantech, Internet/mobile startups, accelerators, investors and supporting service providers."

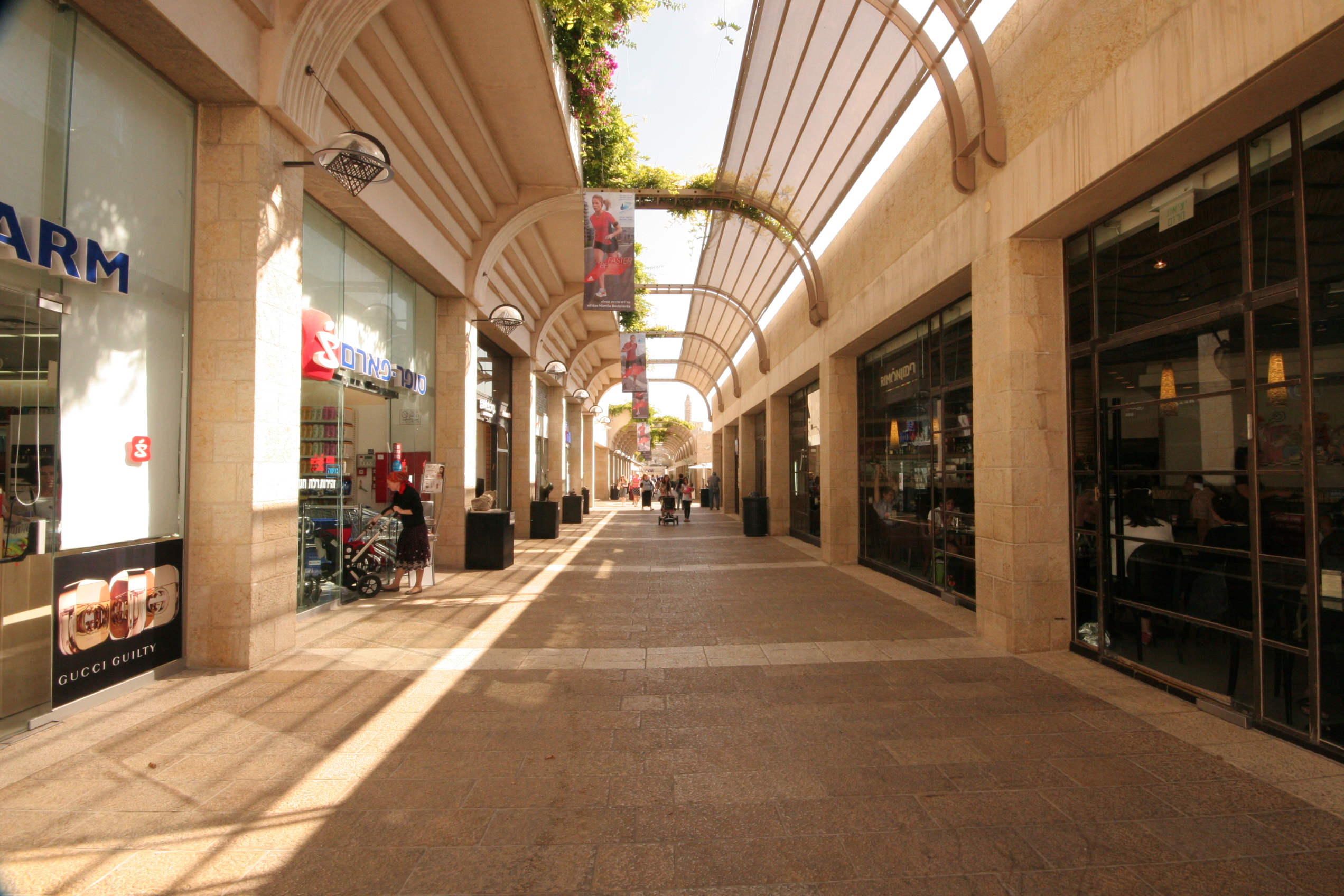
Mamilla Mall adorned with upscale shops stands just outside the Old City Walls.

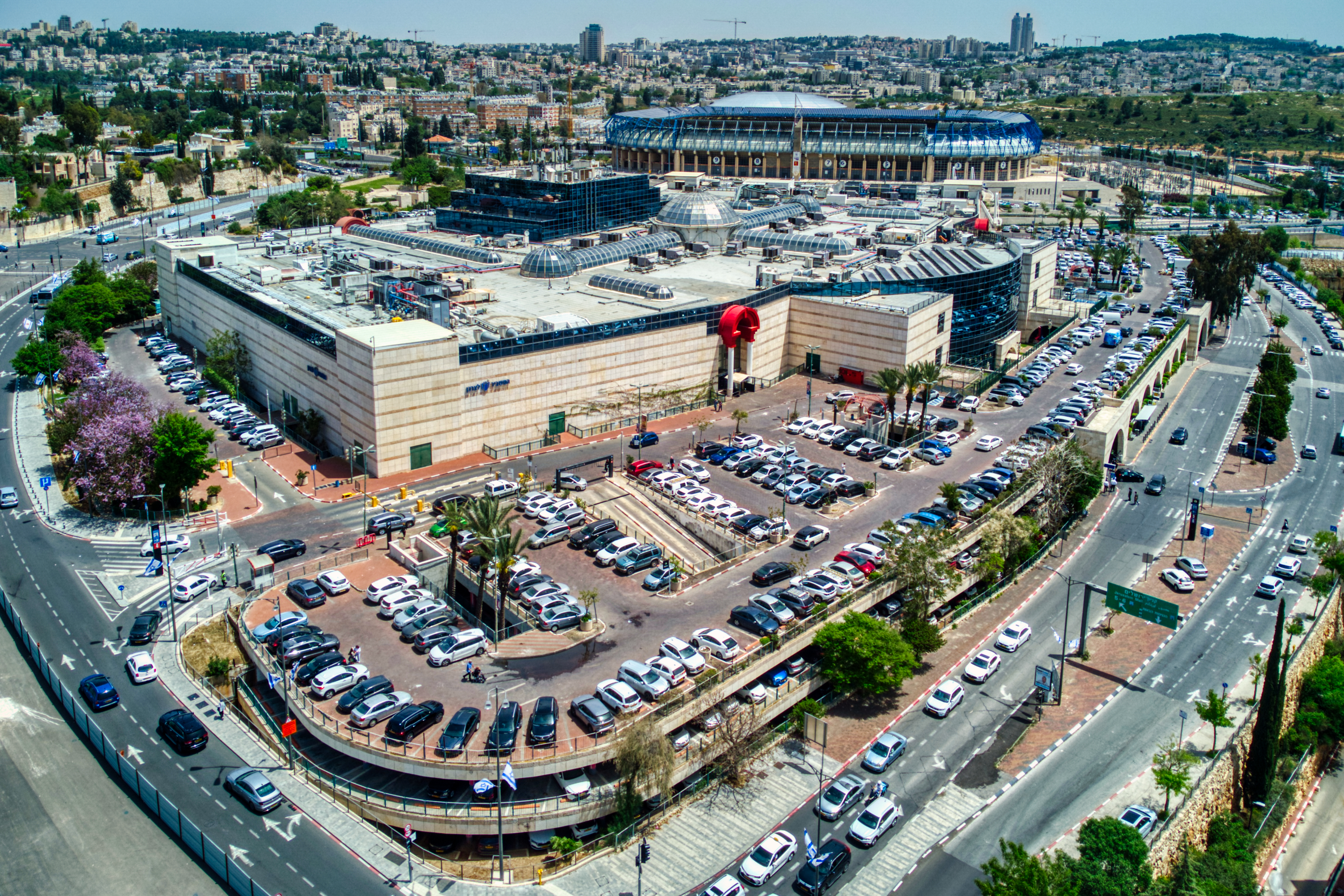
Malha Mall

Higher than average percentages are employed in education (17.9% vs. 12.7%); health and welfare (12.6% vs. 10.7%); community and social services (6.4% vs. 4.7%); hotels and restaurants (6.1% vs. 4.7%); and public administration (8.2% vs. 4.7%). During the British Mandate, a law was passed requiring all buildings to be constructed of Jerusalem stone in order to preserve the unique historic and aesthetic character of the city. Complementing this building code, which is still in force, is the discouragement of heavy industry in Jerusalem; only about 2.2% of Jerusalem's land is zoned for "industry and infrastructure". By comparison, the percentage of land in Tel Aviv zoned for industry and infrastructure is twice as high, and in Haifa, seven times as high. Only 8.5% of the Jerusalem District work force is employed in the manufacturing sector, which is half the national average (15.8%).

Although many statistics indicate economic growth in the city, since 1967, East Jerusalem has lagged behind the development of West Jerusalem. Nevertheless, the percentage of households with employed persons is higher for Arab households (76.1%) than for Jewish households (66.8%). The unemployment rate in Jerusalem (8.3%) is slightly better than the national average (9.0%), although the civilian labour force accounted for less than half of all persons fifteen years or older—lower in comparison to that of Tel Aviv (58.0%) and Haifa (52.4%). Poverty remains a problem in the city as 37% of the families in Jerusalem lived in 2011 below the poverty line. According to a report by the Association for Civil Rights in Israel (ACRI), 78% of Arabs in Jerusalem lived in poverty in 2012, up from 64% in 2006. While the ACRI attributes the increase to the lack of employment opportunities, infrastructure and a worsening educational system, the activist group Ir Amim blames the legal status of Palestinians in Jerusalem.

=== High-rise construction ===
Jerusalem has traditionally had a low-rise skyline. About 18 tall buildings were built at different times in the downtown area when there was no clear policy over the matter. One of them, Holyland Tower 1, Jerusalem's tallest building, is a skyscraper by international standards, rising 32 stories. Holyland Tower 2, which has been approved for construction, will reach the same height.

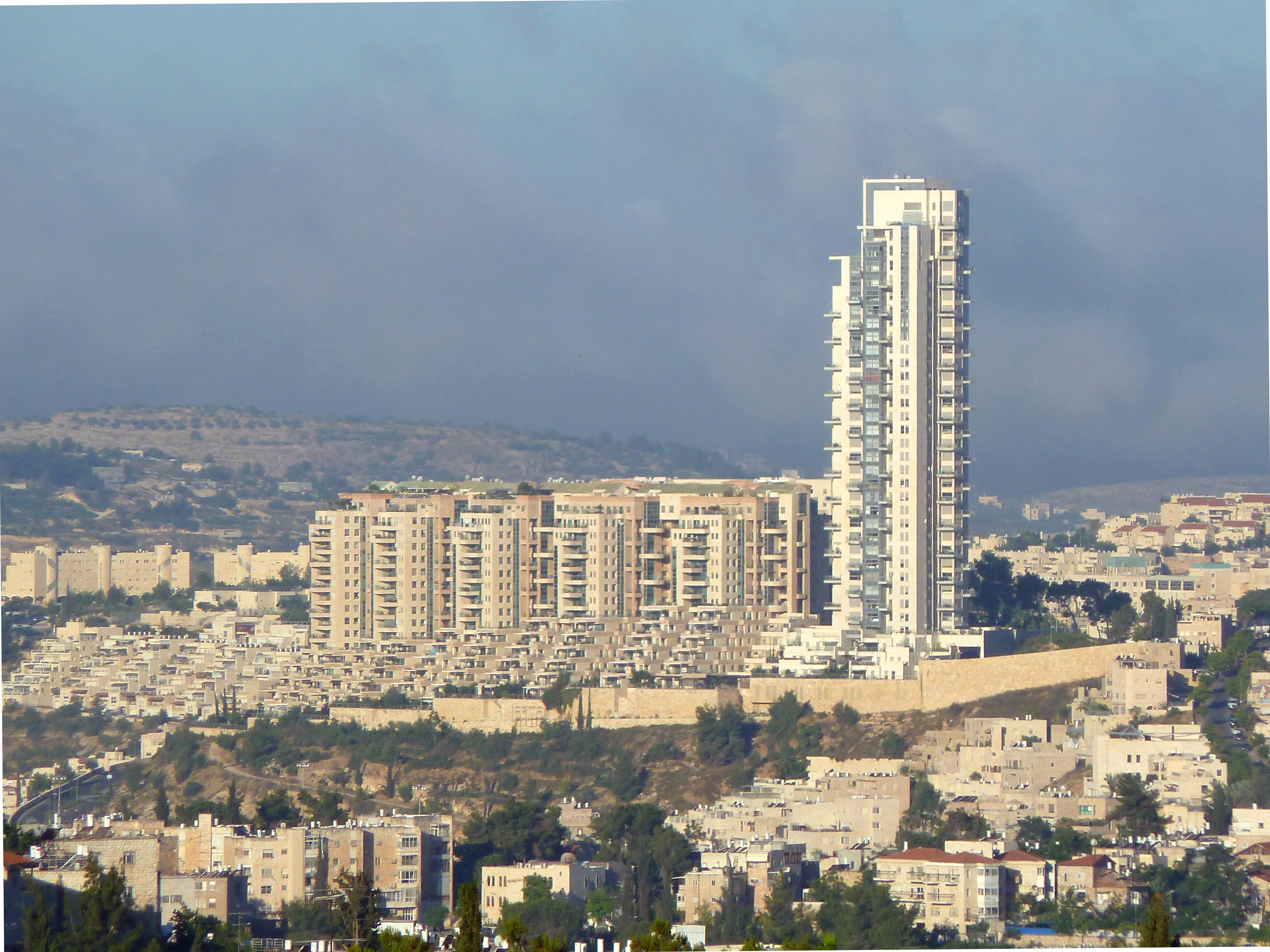
Holyland Tower, Jerusalem's tallest building

A new master plan for the city will see many high-rise buildings, including skyscrapers, built in certain, designated areas of downtown Jerusalem. Under the plan, towers will line Jaffa Road and King George Street. One of the proposed towers along King George Street, the Migdal Merkaz HaYekum, is planned as a 65-story building, which would make it one of the tallest buildings in Israel. At the entrance to the city, near the Jerusalem Chords Bridge and the Central Bus Station, twelve towers rising between 24 and 33 stories will be built, as part of a complex that will also include an open square and an underground train station serving a new express line between Jerusalem and Tel Aviv, and will be connected by bridges and tunnels. Eleven of the skyscrapers will be either office or apartment buildings, and one will be a 2,000-room hotel. The complex is expected to attract many businesses from Tel Aviv, and become the city's main business hub. In addition, a complex for the city's courts and the prosecutor's office will be built, as well as new buildings for Central Zionist Archives and Israel State Archives. The skyscrapers built throughout the city are expected to contain public space, shops, restaurants, and entertainment venues, and it has been speculated that this may lead to a revitalisation of downtown Jerusalem. In August 2015, the city council approved construction of a 344-foot pyramid-shaped skyscraper designed by Daniel Libeskind and Yigal Levi, in place of a rejected previous design by Libeskind; it was set to break ground by 2019.

== Transportation ==
=== Public transport ===
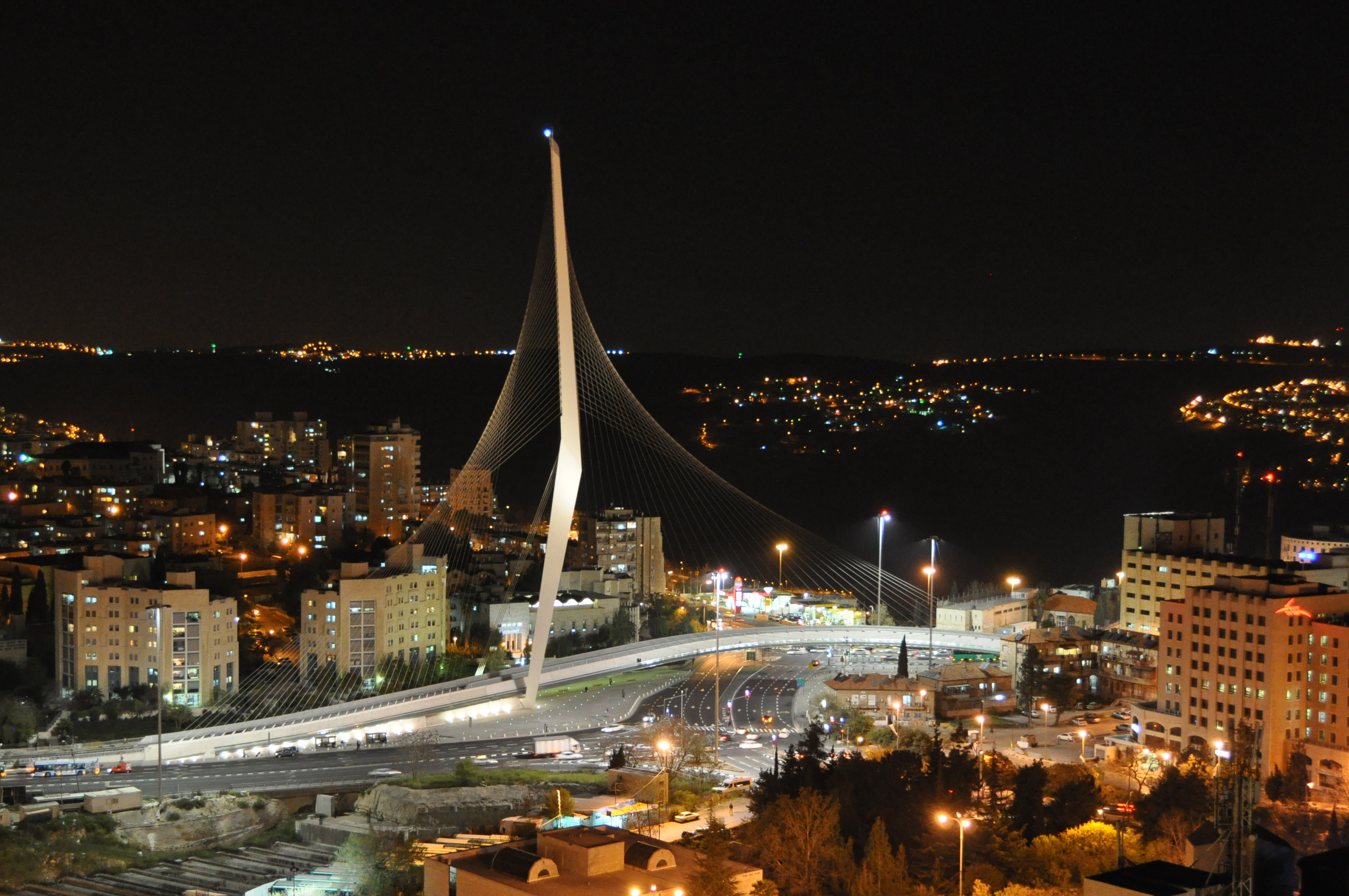
Jerusalem Chords Bridge

Jerusalem is served by highly developed communication infrastructures, making it a leading logistics hub for Israel.

The Jerusalem Central Bus Station, located on Jaffa Road, is the busiest bus station in Israel. It is served by Egged Bus Cooperative, which is the second-largest bus company in the world, The Dan serves the Bnei Brak-Jerusalem route along with Egged, and Superbus serves the routes between Jerusalem, Modi'in Illit and Modi'in-Maccabim-Re'ut. The companies operate from Jerusalem Central Bus Station. Arab neighbourhoods in East Jerusalem and routes between Jerusalem and locations in the West Bank are served by the East Jerusalem Central Bus Station, a transportation hub located near the Old City's Damascus Gate.

=== Railway ===
The Jerusalem Light Rail initiated service in August 2011. According to plans, the first rail line will be capable of transporting an estimated 200,000 people daily, and has 23 stops. The route is from Pisgat Ze'ev in the north via the Old City and city centre to Mount Herzl in the south.

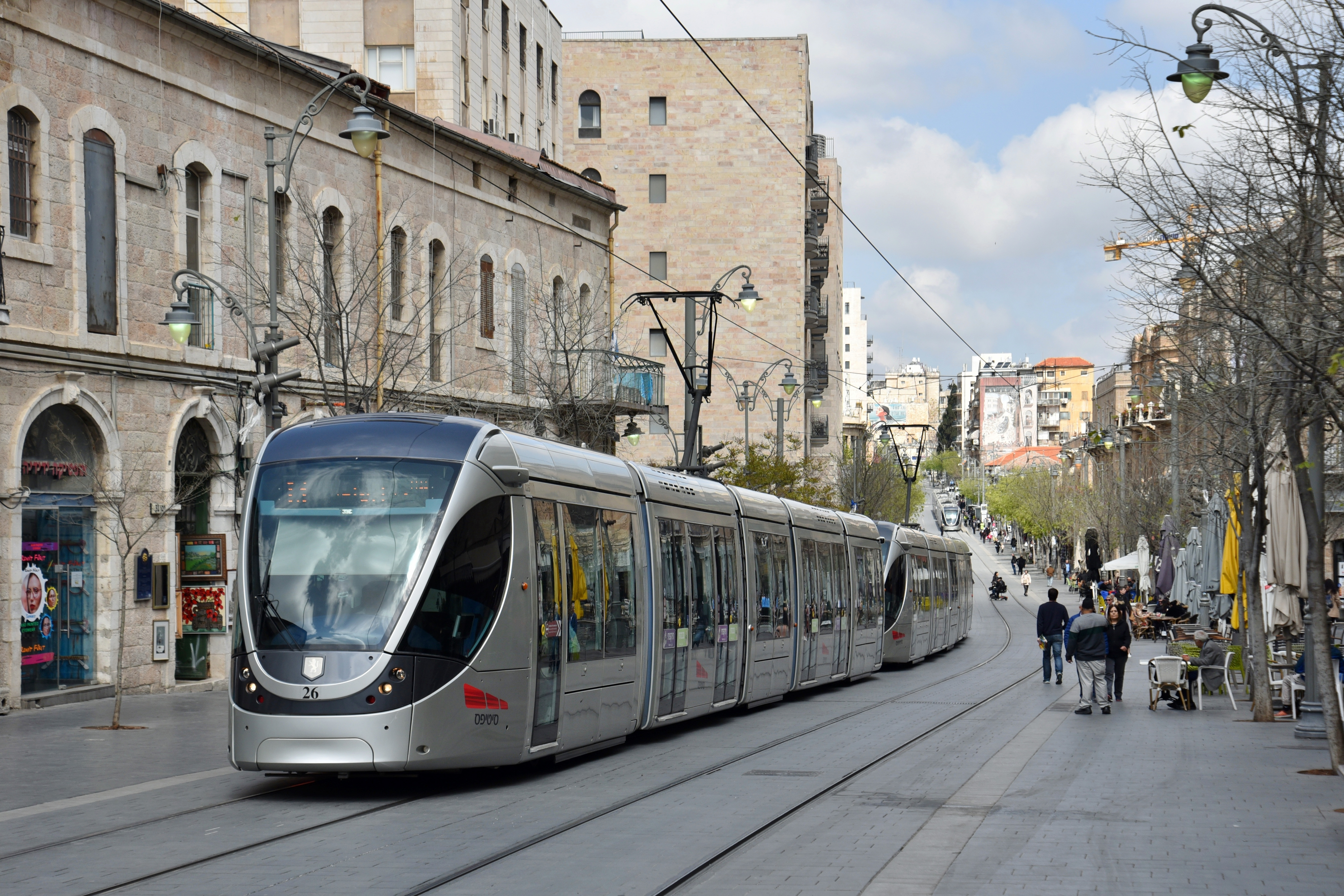
Light Rail tram on Jaffa Road

A high-speed rail line connecting Tel Aviv to Jerusalem became partially operational in 2018 and was completed in 2019. Its terminus is at the new underground station (80 m or 262 ft deep) serving the International Convention Centre and the Central Bus Station, and is planned to be extended eventually to Malha station. Israel Railways operated train services to Malha train station from Tel Aviv via Beit Shemesh, but this service was discontinued in 2020.

Begin Expressway is one of Jerusalem's major north–south thoroughfares; it runs on the western side of the city, merging in the north with Route 443, which continues toward Tel Aviv. Route 60 runs through the centre of the city near the Green Line between East and West Jerusalem. Construction is progressing on parts of a 35 km (22 mi) ring road around the city, fostering faster connection between the suburbs. The eastern half of the project was conceptualised decades ago, but reaction to the proposed highway is still mixed.

== Education ==
=== Universities ===
Jerusalem is home to several prestigious universities offering courses in Hebrew, Arabic and English.

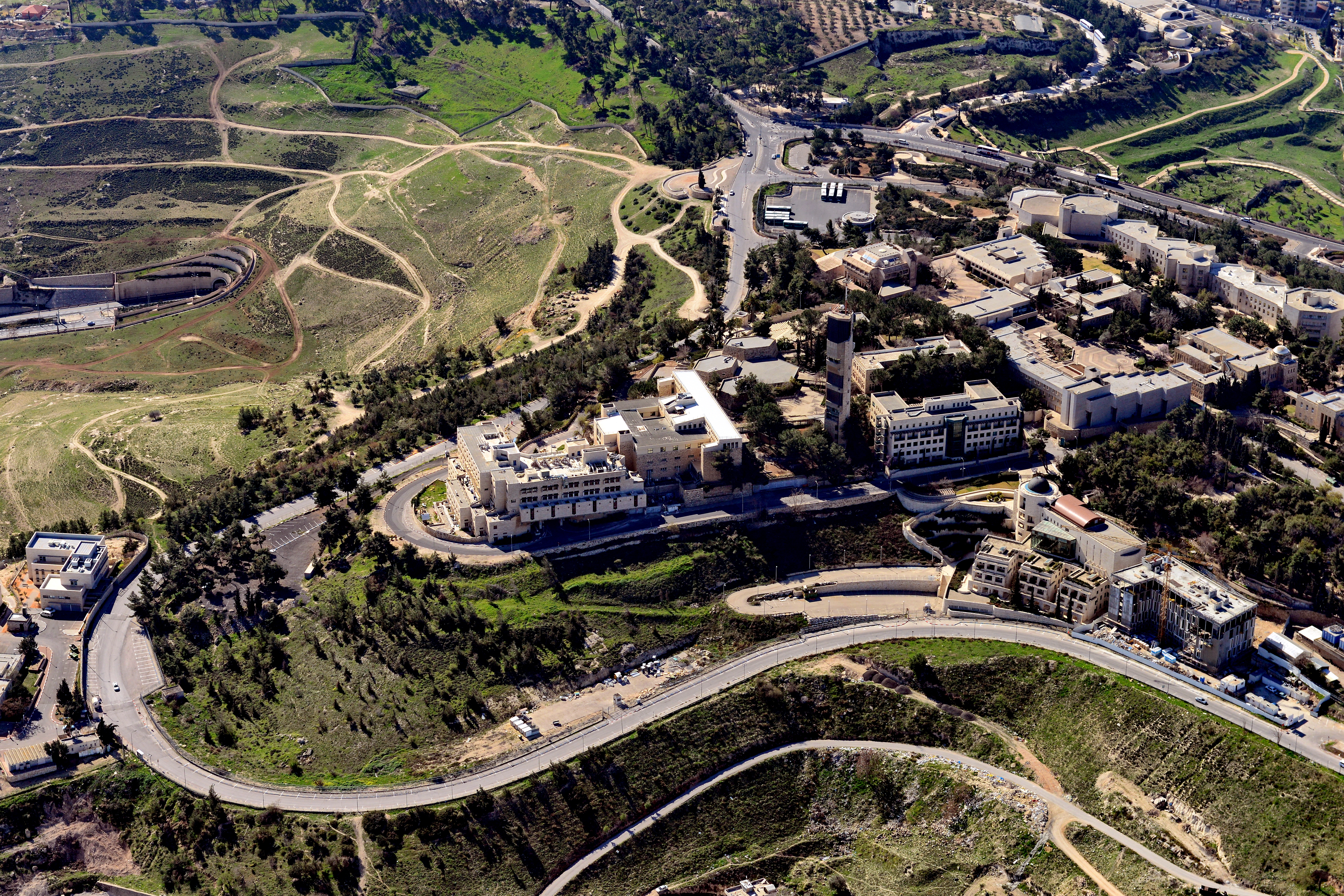
Hebrew University of Jerusalem, Mount Scopus campus

Founded in 1925, the Hebrew University of Jerusalem has been ranked among the top 100 schools in the world. The Board of Governors has included such prominent Jewish intellectuals as Albert Einstein and Sigmund Freud. The university has produced several Nobel laureates; recent winners associated with Hebrew University include Avram Hershko, David Gross, and Daniel Kahneman. One of the university's major assets is the Jewish National and University Library, which houses over five million books. The library opened in 1892, over three decades before the university was established, and is one of the world's largest repositories of books on Jewish subjects. Today it is both the central library of the university and the national library of Israel. The Hebrew University operates three campuses in Jerusalem, on Mount Scopus, on Giv'at Ram and a medical campus at the Hadassah Ein Kerem hospital. The Academy of the Hebrew Language are located in the Hebrew university in Givat Ram and the Israel Academy of Sciences and Humanities located near the Presidents House.

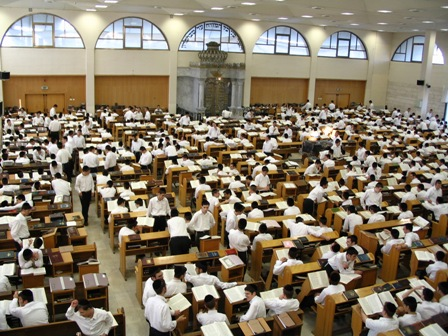
Hebron Yeshiva in Givat Mordechai neighbourhood

The Jerusalem College of Technology, founded in 1969, combines training in engineering and other high-tech industries with a Jewish studies programme. It is one of many schools in Jerusalem, from elementary school and up, that combine secular and religious studies. Numerous religious educational institutions and Yeshivot, including some of the most prestigious yeshivas, among them the Brisk, Chevron, Midrash Shmuel and Mir, are based in the city, with the Mir Yeshiva claiming to be the largest. There were nearly 8,000 twelfth-grade students in Hebrew-language schools during the 2003–2004 school year. However, due to the large portion of students in Haredi Jewish frameworks, only fifty-five percent of twelfth graders took matriculation exams (Bagrut) and only thirty-seven percent were eligible to graduate. Unlike public schools, many Haredi schools do not prepare students to take standardised tests. To attract more university students to Jerusalem, the city has begun to offer a special package of financial incentives and housing subsidies to students who rent apartments in downtown Jerusalem.

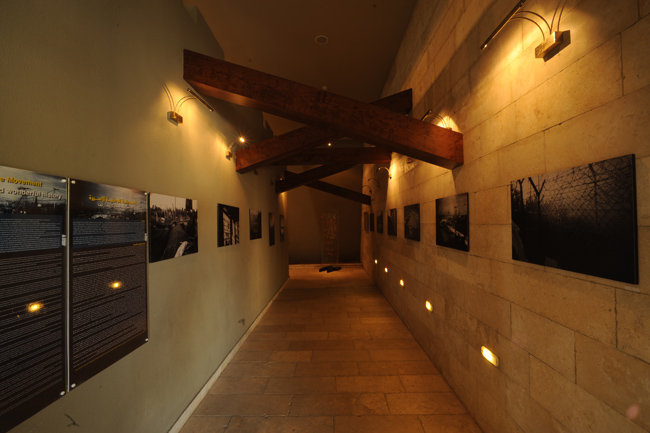
Inside Abu Jihad Museum of Al-Quds University

Al-Quds University was established in 1984 to serve as a flagship university for the Arab and Palestinian peoples. It describes itself as the "only Arab university in Jerusalem". Bard College of Annandale-on-Hudson, New York and Al-Quds University agreed to open a joint college in a building originally built to house the Palestinian Legislative Council and Yasser Arafat's office. The college gives Master of Arts in Teaching degrees. Al-Quds University resides southeast of the city proper on a 190,000 m^{2} (47-acre) Abu Dis campus.

Other institutions of higher learning in Jerusalem are the Jerusalem Academy of Music and Dance and Bezalel Academy of Art and Design, whose buildings are located on the campuses of the Hebrew University.

=== Arab schools ===
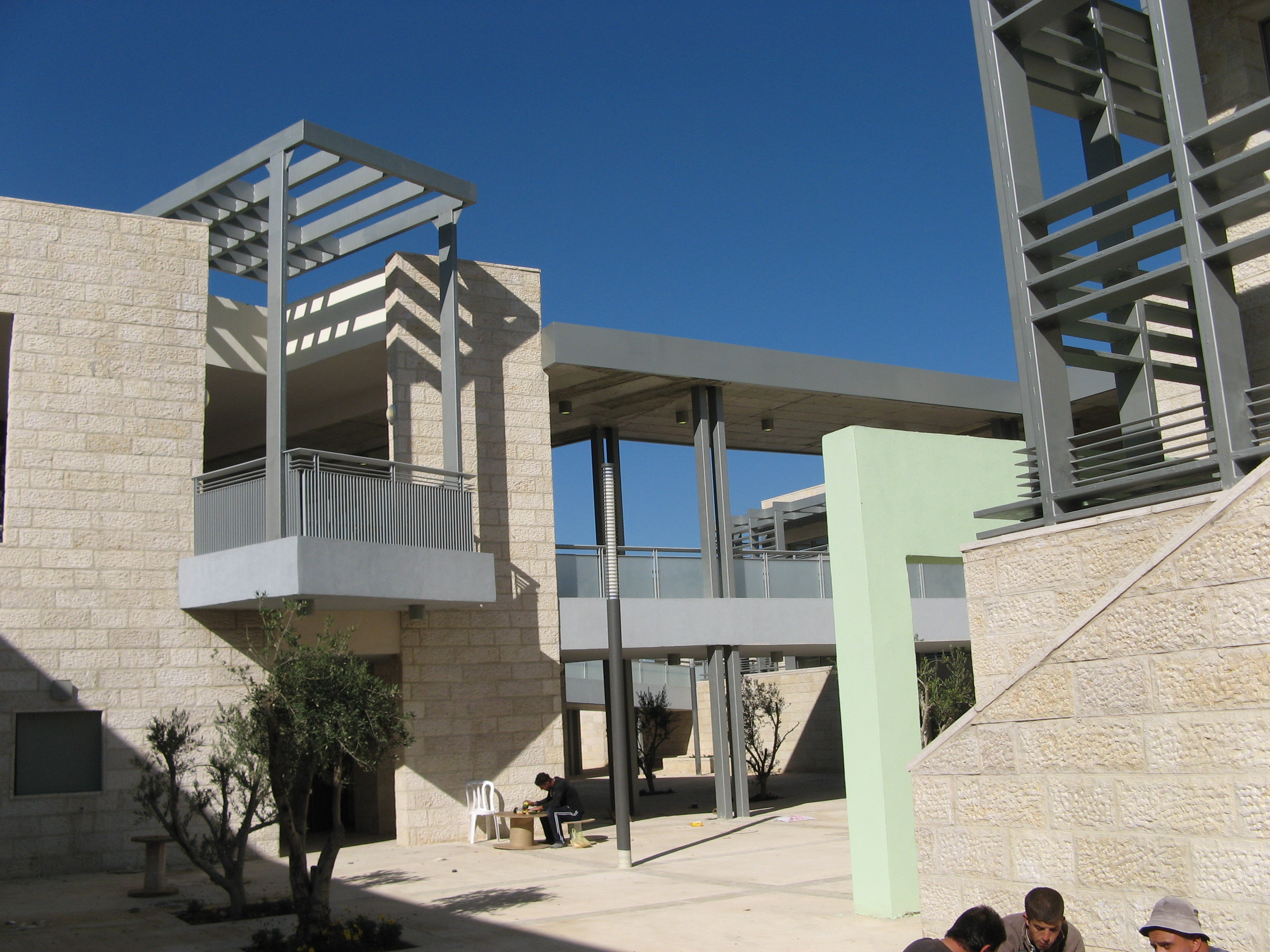
Hand in Hand, a bilingual Jewish-Arab school in Jerusalem

Israel's public schools for Arabs in Jerusalem and other parts of the country have been criticised for offering a lower quality education than those catering to Israeli Jewish students. While many schools in the heavily Arab East Jerusalem are filled to capacity and there have been complaints of overcrowding, the Jerusalem Municipality is building over a dozen new schools in the city's Arab neighbourhoods. Schools in Ras el-Amud and Umm Lison opened in 2008. In March 2007 the Israeli government approved a five-year plan to build 8,000 new classrooms in the city, 40 percent in the Arab sector and 28 percent in the Haredi sector. A budget of 4.6 billion shekels was allocated for this project. In 2008, Jewish British philanthropists donated $3 million for the construction of schools for Arabs in East Jerusalem. Arab high school students take the Bagrut matriculation exams, so that much of their curriculum parallels that of other Israeli high schools and includes certain Jewish subjects.

== Culture ==
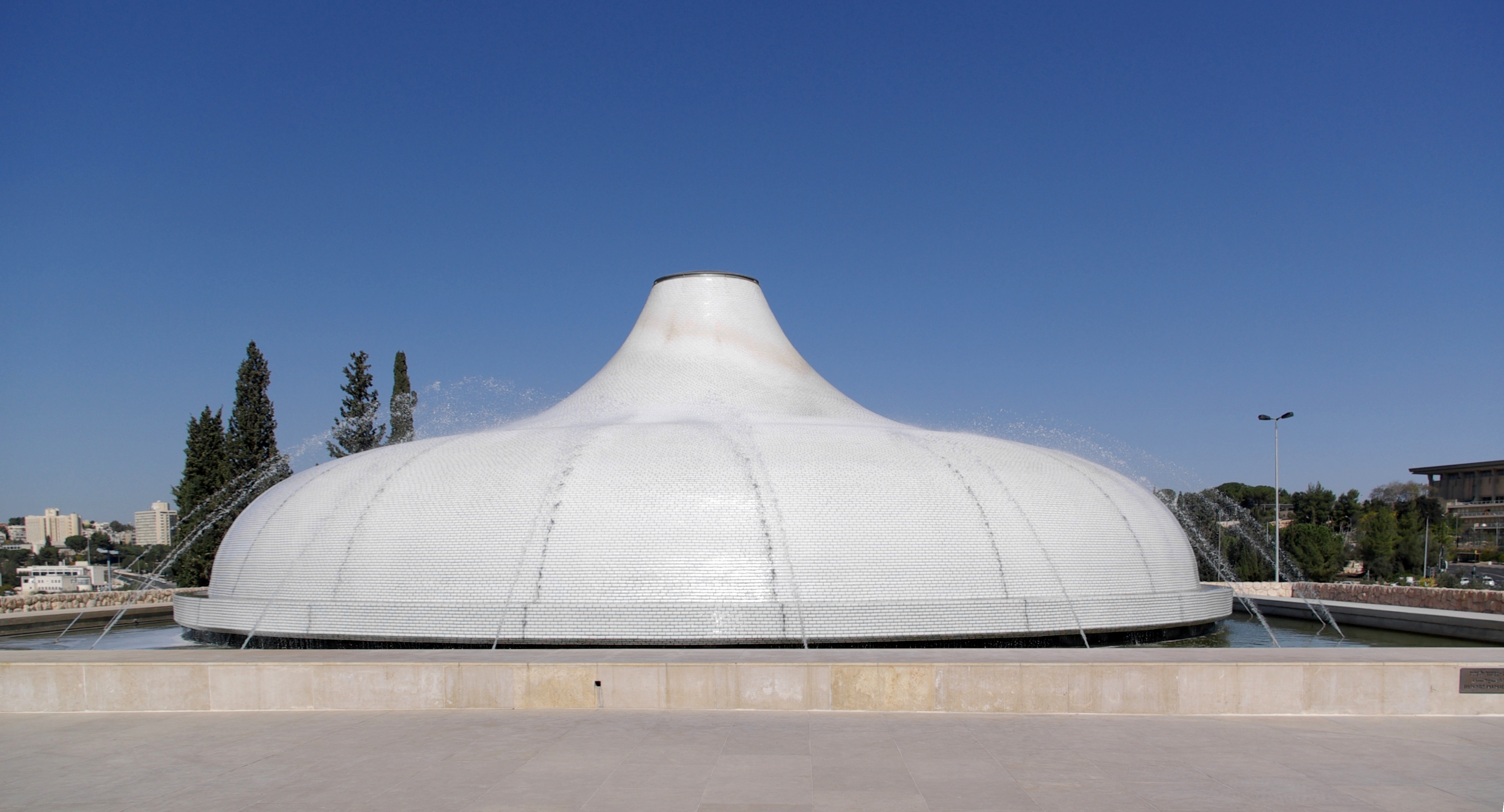
The Shrine of the Book, housing the Dead Sea Scrolls, at the Israel Museum

Although Jerusalem is known primarily for its religious significance, the city is also home to many artistic and cultural venues. The Israel Museum attracts nearly one million visitors a year, approximately one-third of them tourists. The 8 ha (20-acre) museum complex comprises several buildings featuring special exhibits and extensive collections of Judaica, archaeological findings, and Israeli and European art. The Dead Sea scrolls, discovered in the mid-20th century in the Qumran Caves near the Dead Sea, are housed in the Museum's Shrine of the Book. The Youth Wing, which mounts changing exhibits and runs an extensive art education programme, is visited by 100,000 children a year. The museum has a large outdoor sculpture garden and includes the Holyland Model of Jerusalem, a scale-model of the city during the late Second Temple period. The Ticho House in downtown Jerusalem houses the paintings of Anna Ticho and the Judaica collections of her husband, an ophthalmologist who opened Jerusalem's first eye clinic in this building in 1912.

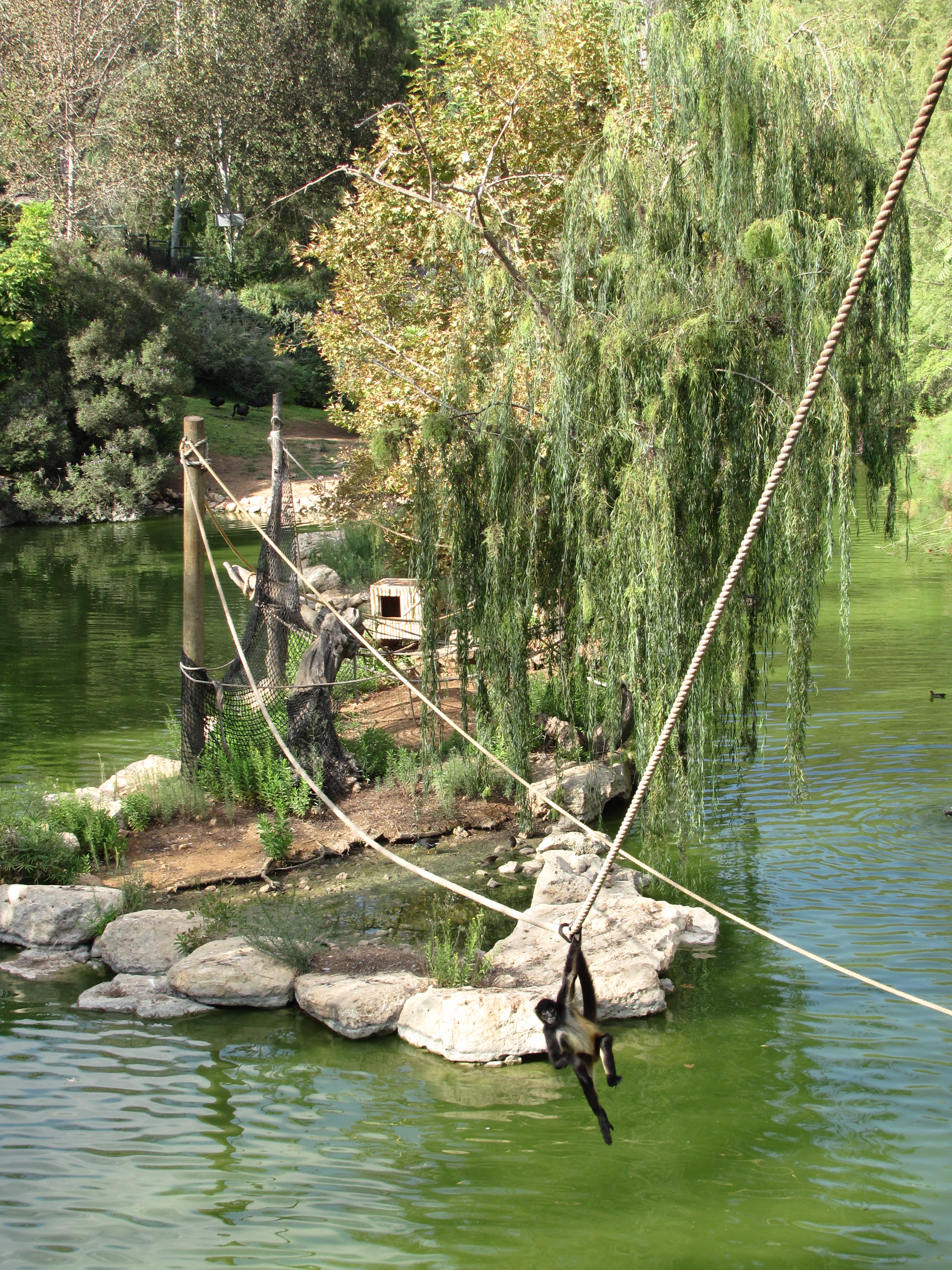
Jerusalem Biblical Zoo

Next to the Israel Museum is the Bible Lands Museum, near The National Campus for the Archaeology of Israel, which includes the Israel Antiquities Authority offices. A World Bible Centre is planned to be built adjacent to Mount Zion at a site called the "Bible Hill". A planned World Kabbalah Centre is to be located on the nearby promenade, overlooking the Old City. The Rockefeller Museum, located in East Jerusalem, was the first archaeological museum in the Middle East. It was built in 1938 during the British Mandate. In 2006, a 38 km (24 mi) Jerusalem Trail was opened, a hiking trail that goes to many cultural sites and national parks in and around Jerusalem. The Jerusalem Biblical Zoo has ranked consistently as Israel's top tourist attraction for Israelis. The national cemetery of Israel is located at the city's western edge, near the Jerusalem Forest on Mount Herzl. The western extension of Mount Herzl is the Mount of Remembrance, where the main Holocaust museum of Israel is located. Yad Vashem, Israel's national memorial to the victims of the Holocaust, houses the world's largest library of Holocaust-related information. It houses an estimated 100,000 books and articles. The complex contains a state-of-the-art museum that explores the genocide of the Jews through exhibits that focus on the personal stories of individuals and families killed in the Holocaust. An art gallery featuring the work of artists who perished is also present. Further, Yad Vashem commemorates the 1.5 million Jewish children murdered by the Nazis, and honours the Righteous among the Nations.

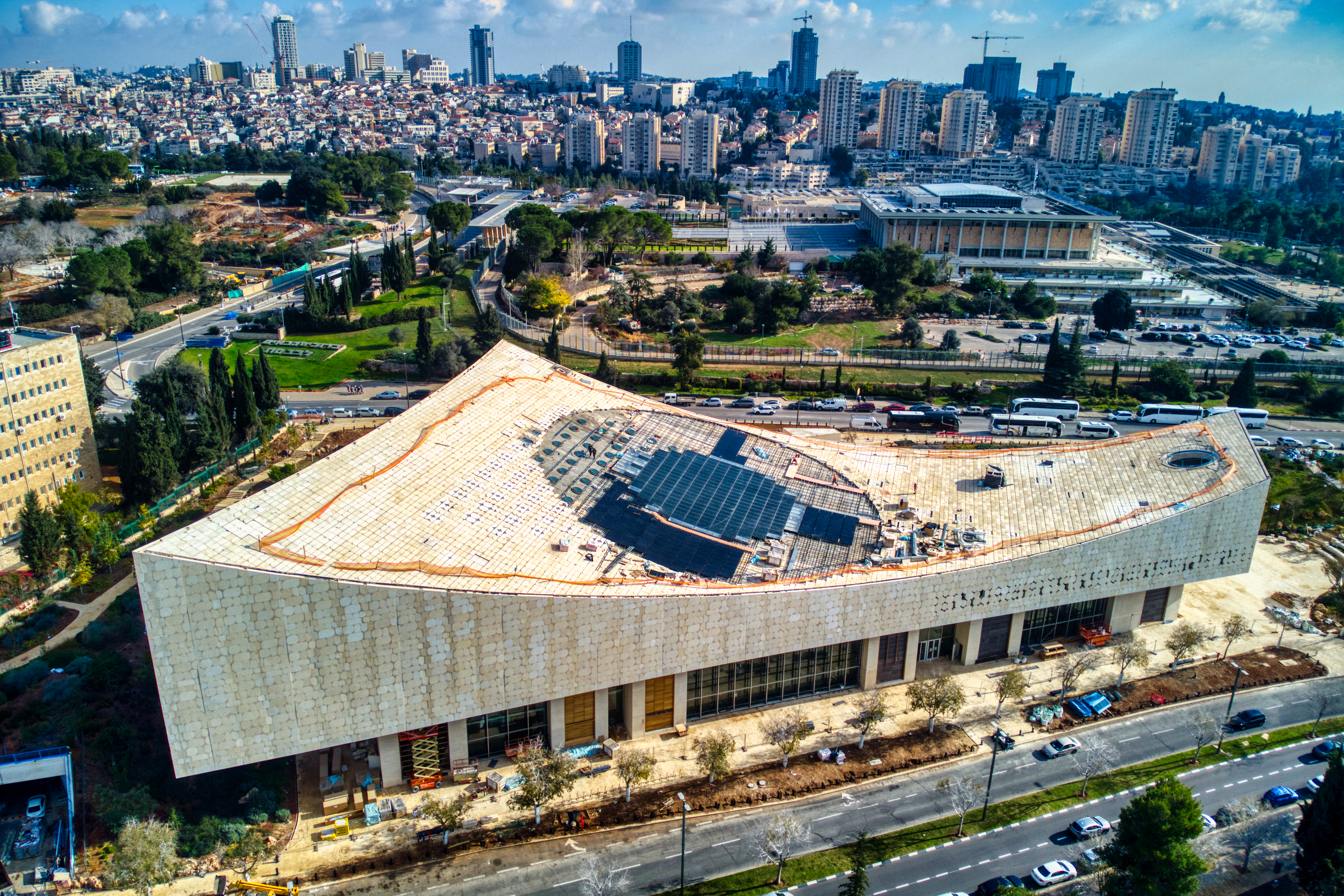
The new building of the National Library of Israel

The Jerusalem Symphony Orchestra, established in the 1940s, has appeared around the world. The International Convention Centre (Binyanei HaUma) near the entrance to city houses the Israel Philharmonic Orchestra. The Jerusalem Cinemateque, the Gerard Behar Centre (formerly Beit Ha'Am) in downtown Jerusalem, the Jerusalem Music Centre in Yemin Moshe, and the Targ Music Centre in Ein Kerem also present the arts. The Israel Festival, featuring indoor and outdoor performances by local and international singers, concerts, plays, and street theatre has been held annually since 1961, and Jerusalem has been the major organiser of this event. The Jerusalem Theatre in the Talbiya neighbourhood hosts over 150 concerts a year, as well as theatre and dance companies and performing artists from overseas. The Khan Theatre, located in a caravanserai opposite the old Jerusalem train station, is the city's only repertoire theatre. The station itself has become a venue for cultural events in recent years as the site of Shav'ua Hasefer (an annual week-long book fair) and outdoor music performances. The Jerusalem Film Festival is held annually, screening Israeli and international films. In 1974 the Jerusalem Cinematheque was founded. In 1981 it was moved to a new building on Hebron Road near the Valley of Hinnom and the Old City.

Jerusalem was declared the Capital of Arab Culture in 2009. Jerusalem is home to the Palestinian National Theatre, which engages in cultural preservation as well as innovation, working to rekindle Palestinian interest in the arts. The Edward Said National Conservatory of Music sponsors the Palestine Youth Orchestra which toured Arab states of the Persian Gulf and other Middle East countries in 2009. The Islamic Museum on the Temple Mount, established in 1923, houses many Islamic artefacts, from tiny kohl flasks and rare manuscripts to giant marble columns. Al-Hoash, established in 2004, is a gallery for the preservation of Palestinian art. While Israel approves and financially supports some Arab cultural activities, Arab Capital of Culture events were banned because they were sponsored by the Palestine National Authority. In 2009 a four-day culture festival was held in the Beit 'Anan suburb of Jerusalem, attended by more than 15,000 people

The Museum on the Seam, which explores issues of coexistence through art, is situated on the road dividing eastern and western Jerusalem. The Abraham Fund and the Jerusalem Intercultural Centre (JICC) promote joint Jewish-Palestinian cultural projects. The Jerusalem Centre for Middle Eastern Music and Dance is open to Arabs and Jews and offers workshops on Jewish-Arab dialogue through the arts. The Jewish-Arab Youth Orchestra performs both European classical and Middle Eastern music. In 2008 the Tolerance Monument, an outdoor sculpture by Czesław Dźwigaj, was erected on a hill between Jewish Armon HaNetziv and Arab Jebl Mukaber as a symbol of Jerusalem's quest for peace.

=== Media ===
The headquarters of the Israel Broadcasting Authority and its successor Israeli Public Broadcasting Corporation are located in Jerusalem, as well as television and radio studios for Channel 12, Channel 13, and part of the radio studios of BBC News. The Jerusalem Post and The Times of Israel are also headquartered in Jerusalem. Local newspapers include the Israeli Kol Ha'ir and the Palestinian Jerusalem Times. God TV, an international Christian television network, is also based in the city.

=== Sports ===
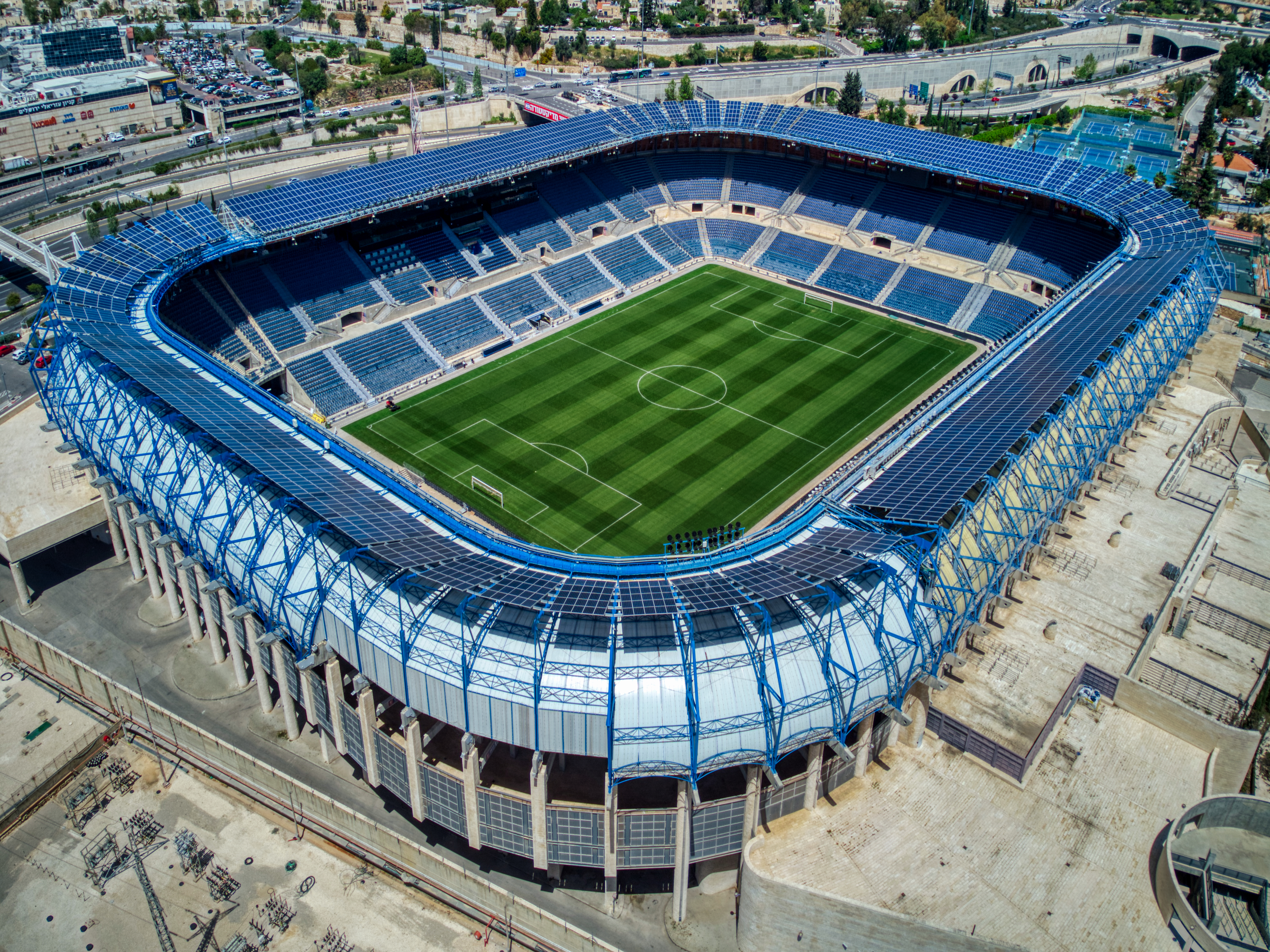
Teddy Stadium, Malha

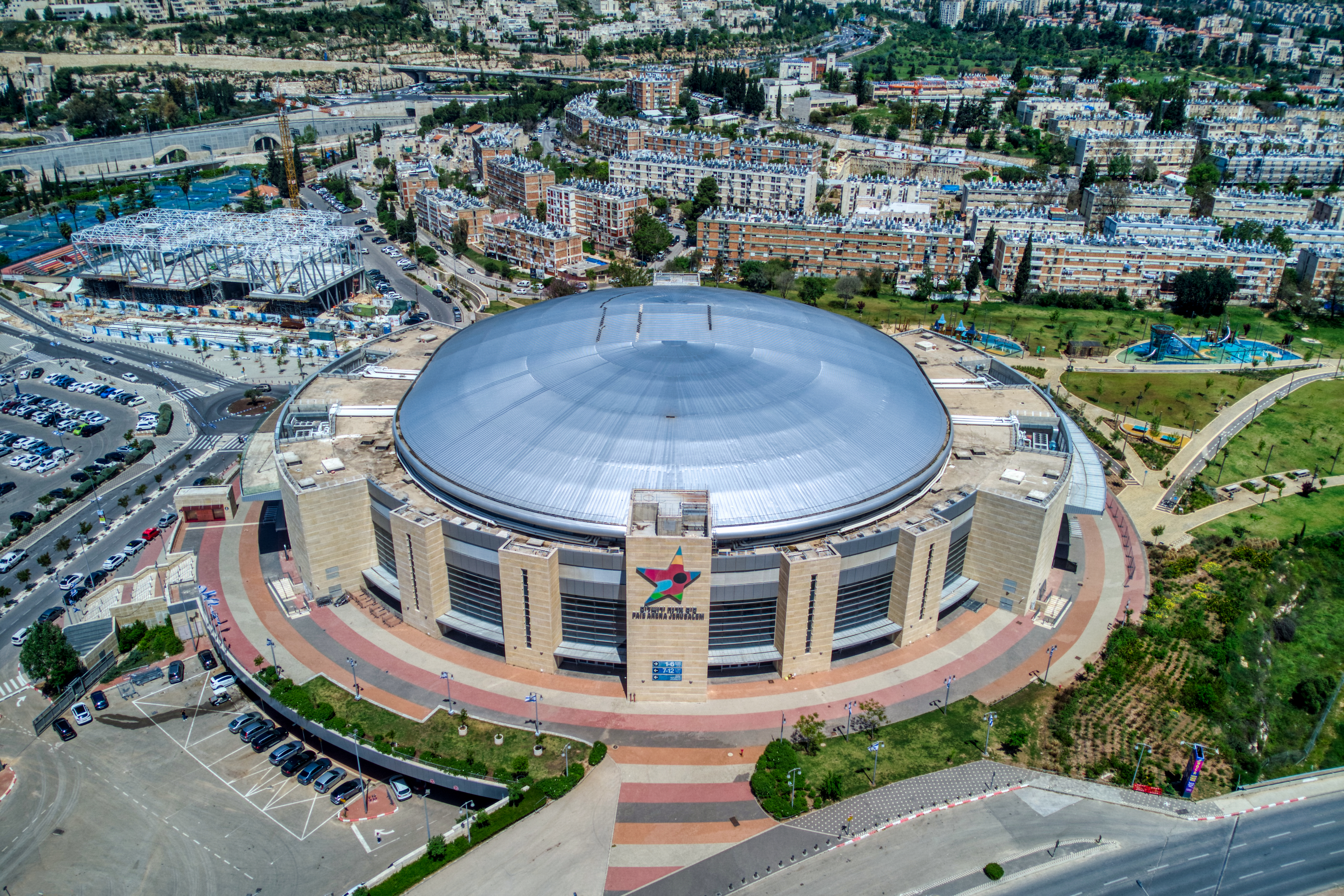
Pais Arena

The two most popular sports are football (soccer) and basketball. Beitar Jerusalem Football Club is one of the most well known in Israel. Fans include political figures who often attend its games. Jerusalem's other major football team, and one of Beitar's top rivals, is Hapoel Jerusalem F.C. Whereas Beitar has been Israel State Cup champion seven times, Hapoel has won the Cup only once. Beitar has won the top league six times, while Hapoel has never succeeded. Beitar plays in the more prestigious Ligat HaAl, while Hapoel is in the second division Liga Leumit. Since its opening in 1992, Teddy Stadium has been Jerusalem's primary football stadium, with a capacity of 31,733.

The most popular Palestinian football club is Jabal Al Mukaber (since 1976) which plays in West Bank Premier League. The club hails from Mount Scopus at Jerusalem, part of the Asian Football Confederation, and plays at the Faisal Al-Husseini International Stadium at Al-Ram, across the West Bank Barrier.

In basketball Hapoel Jerusalem is one of the top teams in the top division. The club has won Israel's championship in 2015, the State Cup four times, and the ULEB Cup in 2004.

The Jerusalem Marathon, established in 2011, is an international marathon race held annually in Jerusalem in the month of March. The full 42-kilometre race begins at the Knesset, passes through Mount Scopus and the Old City's Armenian Quarter, and concludes at Sacher Park. In 2012, the Jerusalem Marathon drew 15,000 runners, including 1,500 from fifty countries outside Israel.

A popular non-competitive sports event is the Jerusalem March, held annually during the Sukkot festival.

== Twin towns and sister cities ==
Jerusalem is twinned with:

East Jerusalem (Claimed by Palestine):

- Cairo, Egypt
- Jakarta, Indonesia
- Tehran, Iran
- Nouakchott, Mauritania
- Fez, Morocco
- Oujda, Morocco

West Jerusalem (Administered by Israel):

- Niterói, Brazil
- Rio de Janeiro, Brazil
- Salvador, Brazil
- Ayabe, Kyoto Prefecture, Japan
- Cusco, Peru
- Jersey City, New Jersey, United States
- New York City, New York, United States

== See also ==
- Greater Jerusalem
- List of people from Jerusalem
- List of places in Jerusalem
- List of songs about Jerusalem

== Bibliography ==
- Gilbert, Martin (1978). Jerusalem: Illustrated History Atlas. New York: Macmillan Publishing.
- Kellerman, Aharon (1993). Society and Settlement: Jewish Land of Israel in the Twentieth Century. State University of New York Press. ISBN 978-0-7914-1295-4.
