= Route 333 (Israel) =

Route in Israel

Ben-Gurion Boulevard
- כביש 333
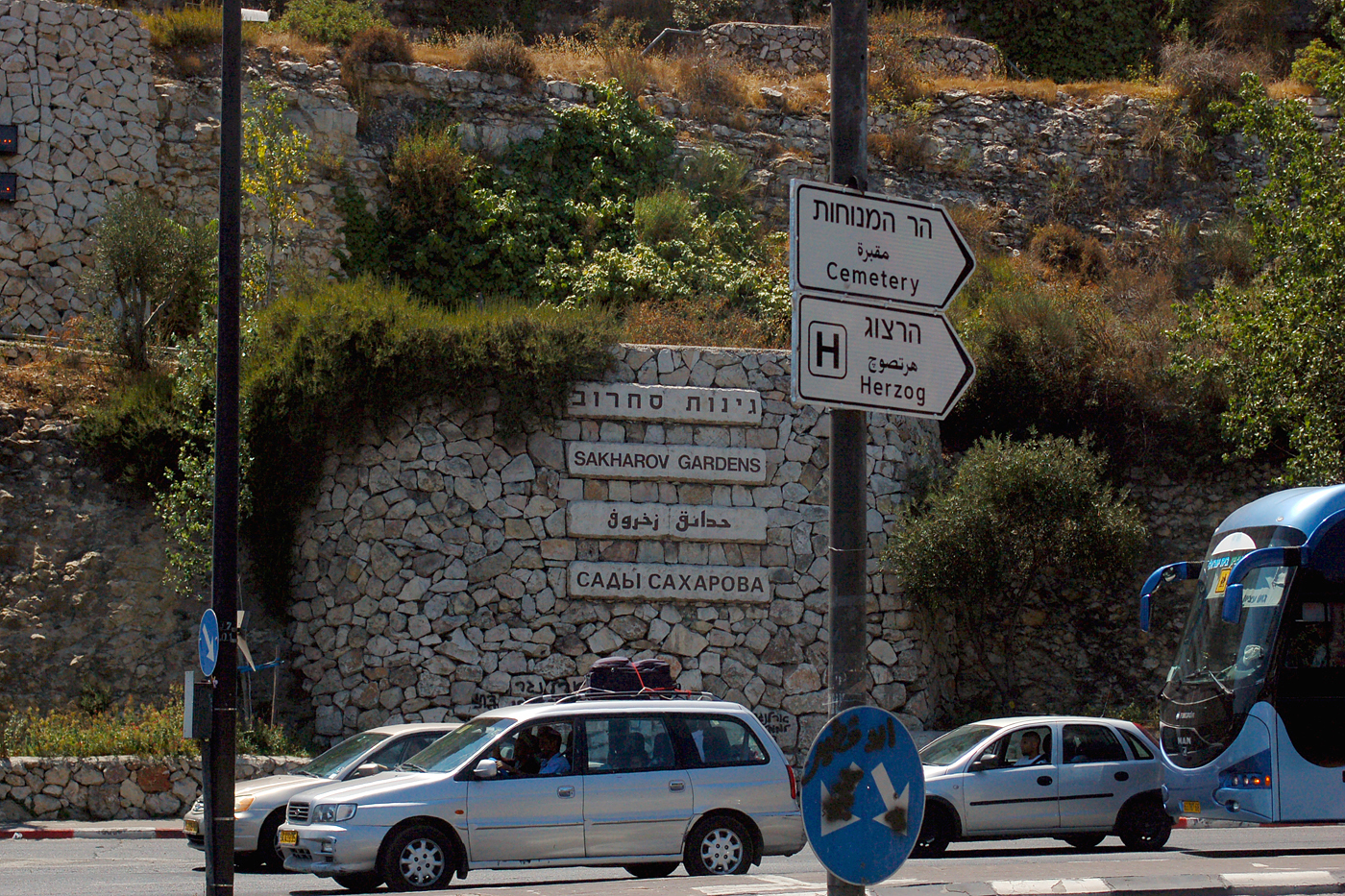
- Sakharov Gardens in 2011

Route information
- Length: 2.51 km (1.56 mi)
- Component highways: Highway 1 (formerly)
- Tourist routes: Ben Gurion House

Major junctions
- West end: Moriah Gate Interchange
- East end: Givat Shaul Interchange

Location
- Country: Israel
- Major cities: Jerusalem

Highway system
- Roads in Israel; Highways
← Route 317	→ Route 334

Highway 333, also known as Ben-Gurion Boulevard, is a highway in West Jerusalem. It is the main entrance to the city through Givat Shaul. In the past, the road was part of Highway 1 until the opening of Yitzhak Shamir Road and the diverting of Highway 1 onto it. However, it is often colloquially still referred to as part of the Jerusalem–Tel Aviv Route.

== History ==
The road, named for Israeli Prime Minister David Ben-Gurion, was originally constructed as part of the Jerusalem–Tel Aviv line, also known as Highway 1, which is based on the ancient road between Jaffa and Jerusalem via Ramla (Highway 44), Latrun, Sha'ar HaGai, and Abu Ghosh. The section that belongs to Route 333 today is between the Sha'ar Morai interchange and the entrance to Jerusalem through Ginot Sakharov Junction.

In 2007, Yitzhak Shamir Road (known as Highway 9) was paved as a direct road between Motza and Yigal Yadin Interchange and a continuation of Highway 1 towards Ma'ale Adumim and Beit HaArava Junction on the Jerusalem–Jericho Road. As a result, the Ben-Gurion Boulevard was no longer officially considered part of the redrawn route of Highway 1.

Work began in March 2017 to upgrade the Ganot Sakharov Junction to an interchange, and in 2021, it was opened to traffic. Concurrently, work was carried out at the Moriah Gate Interchange that rearranged traffic, so that the left lanes are those that point to the route to Emeq HaArazim, and that the right lanes point to Highway 333. The public transportation lane, established in the 2010s, remained as the left lane on the route of Ben-Gurion Boulevard. After the opening of the Ginot Sakharov interchange, Ben-Gurion Boulevard was marked for the first time as Route 333.

== Interchanges (West to East) ==
District	Location	km	mi	Name	Destinations	Notes
Jerusalem	Har HaMenuchot	0.00	0.00	מחלף שער מוריה (Moriah Gate Interchange)	Highway 1	
Jerusalem	Har HaMenuchot; Givat Shaul	1.56	0.97	מחלף גינות סחרוב (Sakharov Gardens Interchange)	Meginei Yerushalayim Street	
Jerusalem	Givat Shaul	2.51	1.56	מחלף גבעת שאול (Givat Shaul Interchange)	Highway 50	
1.000 mi = 1.609 km; 1.000 km = 0.621 mi

After the Givat Shaul Interchange, the road is not marked as Route 333. However, the road continues as Weizmann Boulevard through the Chords Bridge Junction with Jaffa Road and Yirmiyahu Road (Route 417), and the junction of Shalom S. Shitrit Square with Herzl Boulevard (Route 386). The Road continues as Shazar Boulevard (near Binyanei Ha'uma), Ben-Zvi Boulevard, and then Haim Hazaz Boulevard to Gala Galaction Square.

== See also ==
- Jerusalem Gateway
- Transport in Jerusalem
