= Yitzhak Shamir Road =

Stretch of highway in Jerusalem

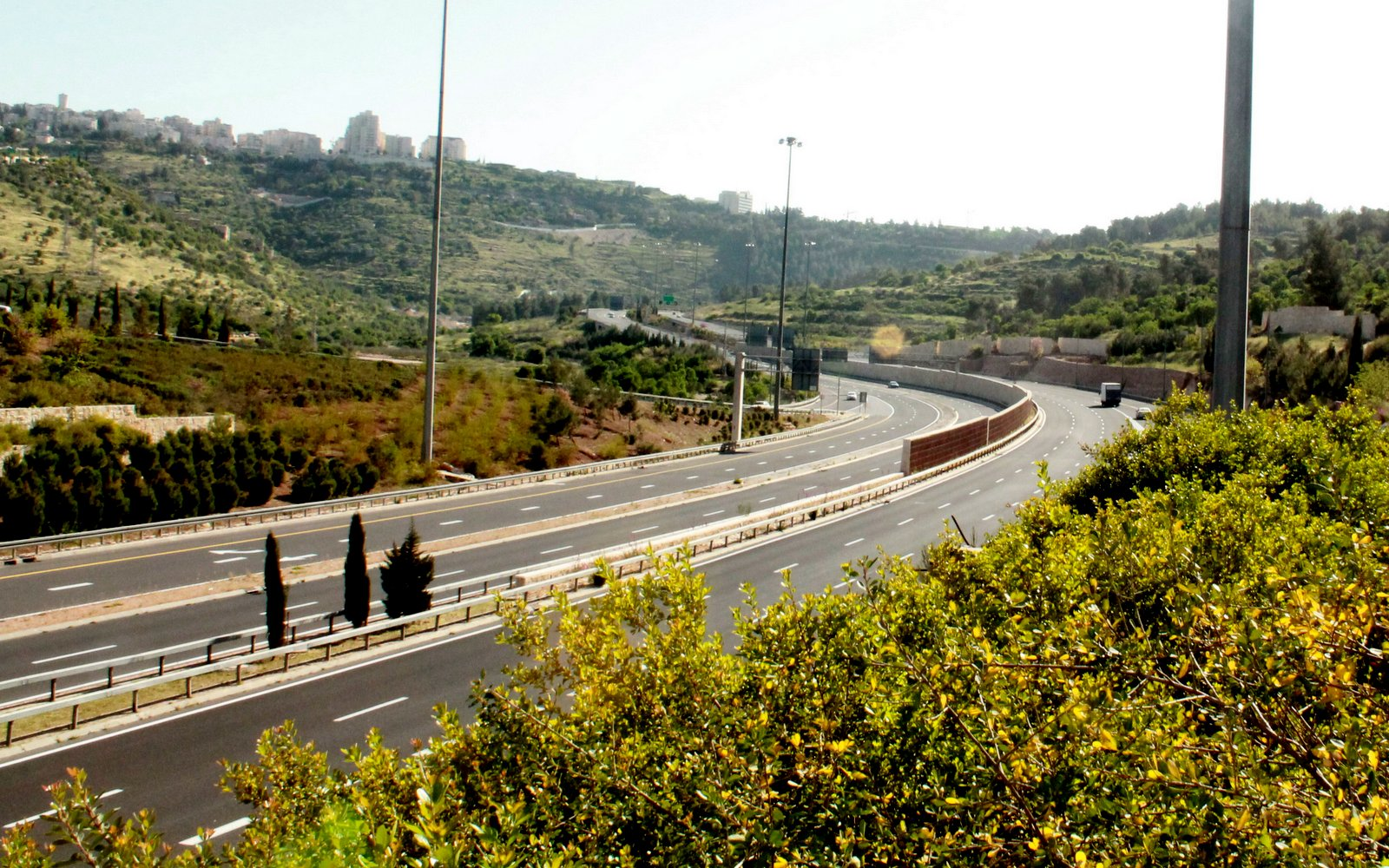
- View from Ramot

Route information
- Length: 3.6 km (2.2 mi)
- Existed: 2001-2007–present
- Component highways: Highway 1

Major junctions
- From: Moriah Gate Interchange
- To: Yigal Yadin Interchange

Location
- Country: Israel
- Regions: Gush Dan
- Major cities: Jerusalem

Highway system
- Roads in Israel; Highways

Yitzhak Shamir Road (Hebrew: דרך יצחק שמיר) is a section of Highway 1 between the Moriah Gate Interchange and the Yigal Yadin Interchange. In the past, this section was called Jerusalem Road 9 after the road construction project that was built by Moriah. The section passes through the jurisdiction of the city of Jerusalem. The section of road initially opened in 2007, and includes construction of a bridge to split traffic on highway one to the area of the Moriah Gate Interchange and the construction of two tunnels in Emeq HaArazim. It is 3.6 km long and includes a two-lane tunnel around 400 meters long. ITs construction lasted six years and costed 500 million Israeli shekels ($125 million USD in 2007).

The stretch of road allows for passengers from Gush Dan into the northern neighborhoods of Jerusalem and those travelling to the Dead Sea to bypass crowded urban transportation routes, therefore easing congestion at the western entrance to Jerusalem, which was only possible through Sakharov Gardens prior to construction.

== History ==
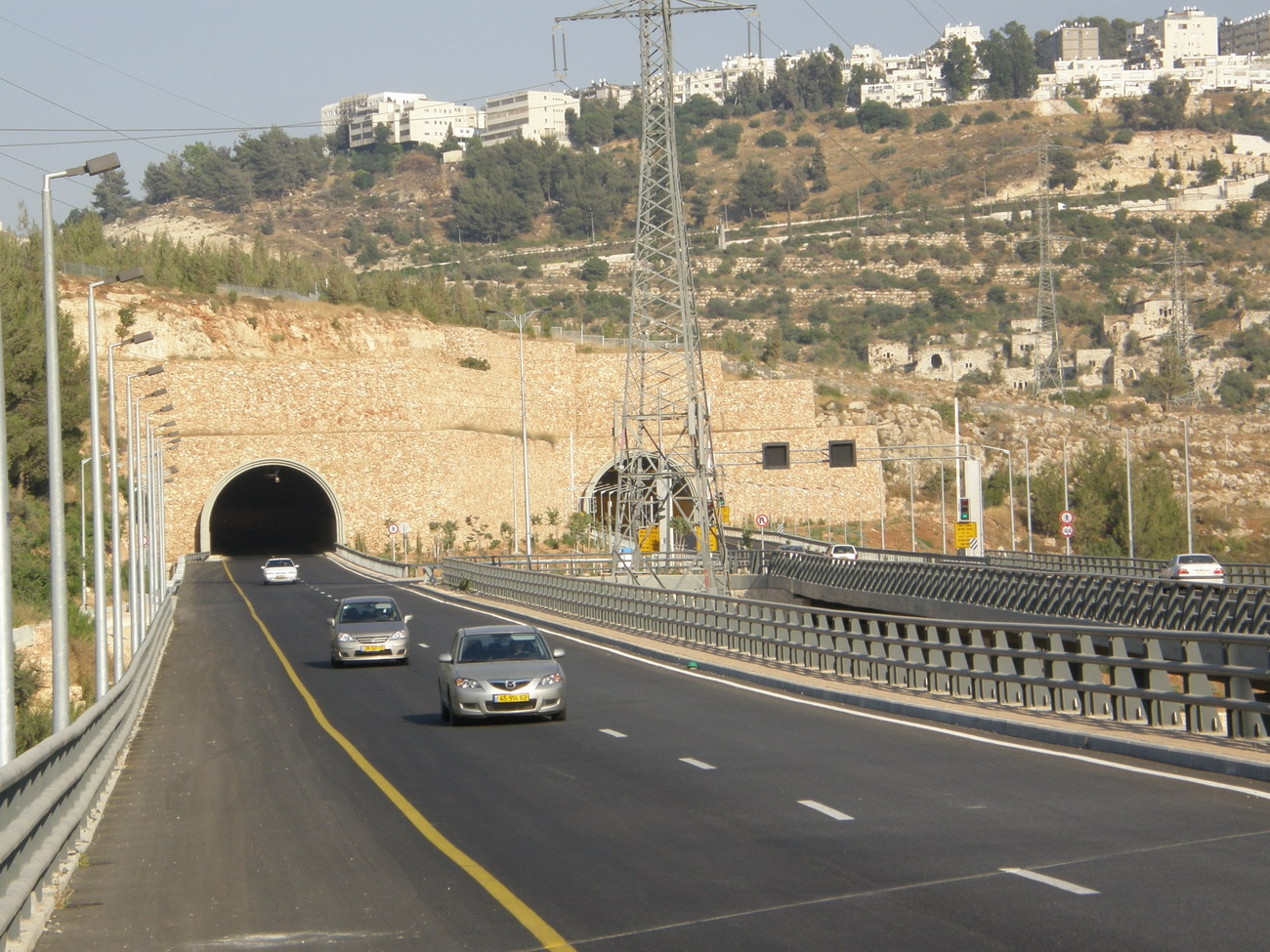
Entrance to the tunnel on the road in Emeq HaArazim

The potential route of the road was first determined in the Jerusalem Master Plan of 1968, where it was designated as "Route 9." The eastern part of Highway 9, between Yigal Yadin and the East Gate Interchange, was paved in the 1980s and opened in January 1987. In 1990, it was decided to go forward with construction of the western part of the road, to better link tavel from Ramot and East Gate to Northern Jerusalem, and to ease traffic in the entrance to the city. However, the final plan was only approvied in 1999, after it was decided to dig tunnels along the route of the road under Mount Mitzpe Naftuch.

It was under consideration that the road might be a toll road, but the idea was not implemented. Construction began in 2001 by Ramet and Shapir Engineering & Industry. Early estimates of construction hovered around 380 million Israeli shekels. The road had a delay in paving due to oppositions from residents of Ramot, as many thought that a construction project would ruin the natural landscape of Emeq HaArazim, although the project did eventually begin.

Yitzhak Shamir Road was supposed to open in 2005, but was delayed due to budget cuts that slowed consistent construction. In May 2007, a day before the planned opening ceremony, all events related to the opening road were cancelled due to an injunction from the Jerusalem District Court because of a petition filed by the Society for the Protection of Nature in Israel which stated that the conservation of Emeq had not been fully completed.

In October 2014, the road was named after Yitzhak Shamir, the 7th Prime Minister of Israel.
