= Ben-Gurion Boulevard =

Ben-Gurion Boulevard (Hebrew: שדרות בן-גוריון) may refer to:

- Route 333 (Israel)
- Ben-Gurion Boulevard (Tel Aviv)
- Ben-Gurion Boulevard (Haifa)
- Ben-Gurion Boulevard (Herzliya)
