= Andrei Sakharov =

Soviet nuclear physicist and human rights activist (1921–1989)

- Андрей Сахаров
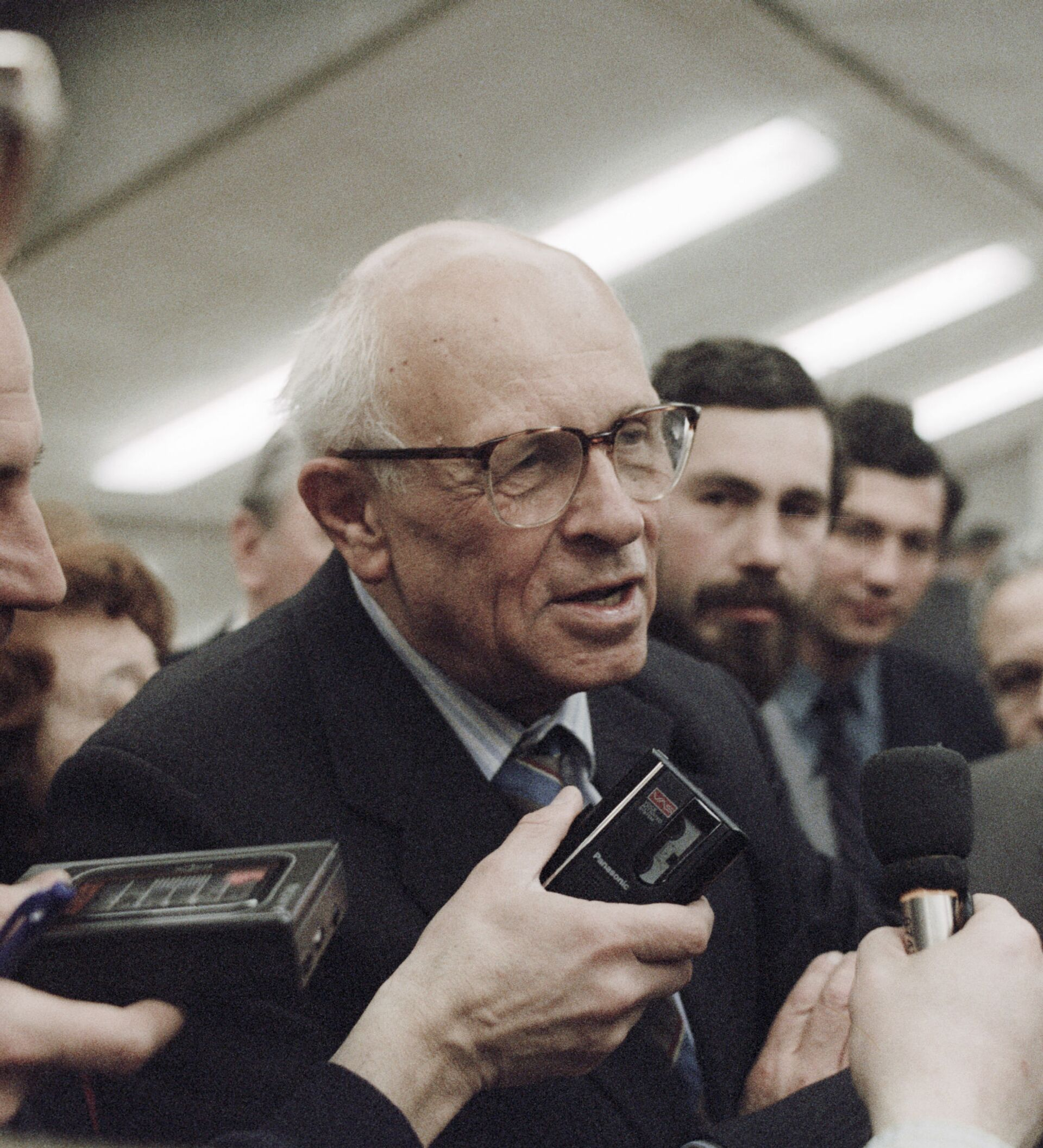
- Sakharov in March 1989
- Born: 21 May 1921; Moscow, Russian SFSR
- Died: 14 December 1989 (aged 68); Moscow, Soviet Union
- Resting place: Vostryakovskoye Cemetery
- Education: Moscow State University; Lebedev Physical Institute
- Known for: RDS-37; Soviet nuclear program; Tsar Bomba; Explosively pumped flux compression generator; Electromagnetic pulse; Tokamak; Muon-catalyzed fusion; Sakharov conditions; Induced gravity; Proton decay; Dissidence; Human rights activism; Sakharov Prize
- Spouses: Klavdia Vikhireva (m. 1943; died 1969); Yelena Bonner (m. 1972)
- Awards: Hero of Socialist Labor (1953, 1955, 1962); Stalin Prize (1953); Lenin Prize (1956); Prix mondial Cino Del Duca (1974); Nobel Peace Prize (1975); Elliott Cresson Medal (1985)
- Scientific career
- Fields: Physics
- Thesis: Теория ядерных переходов типа 0→0 (1947)
- Doctoral advisor: Igor Tamm

Andrei Dmitrievich Sakharov (Russian: Андрей Дмитриевич Сахаров; 21 May 1921 – 14 December 1989) was a Soviet physicist and a Nobel Peace Prize laureate, which he was awarded in 1975 for emphasizing human rights around the world.

Although he spent his career in physics in the Soviet program of nuclear weapons, overseeing the development of thermonuclear weapons, Sakharov also did fundamental work in understanding particle physics, magnetism, and physical cosmology. Sakharov is mostly known for his political activism for individual freedom, human rights, civil liberties and reforms in the Soviet Union, for which he was deemed a dissident and faced persecution from the Soviet establishment.

In his memory, the Sakharov Prize was established and is awarded annually by the European Parliament for people and organizations dedicated to human rights and freedoms.

== Life and career ==
=== Family background and early life ===
Andrei Dmitrievich Sakharov was born in Moscow on 21 May 1921, to a Russian family. His father, Dmitri Ivanovich Sakharov, was a physics professor at the Second Moscow State University and an amateur pianist. His grandfather, Ivan, was a lawyer in the former Russian Empire who had displayed respect for social awareness and humanitarian principles (including advocating the abolition of capital punishment). Sakharov's mother, Yekaterina Alekseevna Sofiano, was a daughter of Aleksey Semenovich Sofiano, a general in the Tsarist Russian Army with Greek heritage.

Sakharov's parents and paternal grandmother, Maria Petrovna, largely shaped his personality; his mother and grandmother were members of the Russian Orthodox Church, although his father was a non-believer. When Andrei was about thirteen, he realized that he did not believe in God. However, despite being an atheist, he did believe in a "guiding principle" that transcends physical laws.

After schooling, Sakharov studied physics at the Moscow State University in 1938 and, following evacuation in 1941 from fighting on the Eastern Front with Germany, he graduated in Ashgabat in the Turkmen Soviet Socialist Republic. In 1942 he moved to Ulyanovsk, working in the Voldarsky munitions plant. Whilst there, he invented a successful process to test for flaws in armour piercing shells.. In 1943, he married Klavdia Alekseyevna Vikhireva, with whom he raised two daughters and a son. They were married until Klavdia's death in 1969. In 1945, he joined the Theoretical Department of Physical Institute of the Russian Academy of Sciences under Igor Tamm in Moscow. In 1947, Sakharov successfully defended his thesis for the Doctor of Sciences (lit. Doktor Nauk), which covered the topic of nuclear transmutation.

=== Soviet program of nuclear weapons ===
After World War II, he researched cosmic rays. In mid-1948 he participated in the Soviet atomic bomb project under Igor Kurchatov and Igor Tamm. Sakharov's study group at FIAN in 1948 came up with a second concept in August–September 1948. Adding a shell of natural, unenriched uranium around the deuterium would increase the deuterium concentration at the uranium-deuterium boundary and the overall yield of the device, because the natural uranium would capture neutrons and itself fission as part of the thermonuclear reaction. This idea of a layered fission-fusion-fission bomb led Sakharov to call it the sloika, or layered cake. The first Soviet atomic device was tested on August 29, 1949. After moving to Sarov in 1950, Sakharov played a key role in the development of the first megaton-range Soviet hydrogen bomb using a design known as Sakharov's Third Idea in Russia and the Teller–Ulam design in the United States. Before his Third Idea, Sakharov tried a "layer cake" of alternating layers of fission and fusion fuel. The results were disappointing, yielding no more than a typical fission bomb. However the design was seen to be worth pursuing because deuterium is abundant and uranium is scarce, and he had no idea how powerful the US design was. Sakharov realised that in order to cause the explosion of one side of the fuel to symmetrically compress the fusion fuel, a mirror could be used to reflect the radiation. The details had not been officially declassified in Russia when Sakharov was writing his memoirs, but in the Teller–Ulam design, soft X-rays emitted by the fission bomb were focused onto a cylinder of lithium deuteride to compress it symmetrically. This is called radiation implosion. The Teller–Ulam design also had a secondary fission device inside the fusion cylinder to assist with the compression of the fusion fuel and generate neutrons to convert some of the lithium to tritium, producing a mixture of deuterium and tritium. Sakharov's idea was first tested as RDS-37 in 1955. A larger variation of the same design which Sakharov worked on was the 50 Mt Tsar Bomba of October 1961, which was the most powerful nuclear device ever detonated.

Sakharov saw "striking parallels" between his fate and those of J. Robert Oppenheimer and Edward Teller in the US. Sakharov believed that in this "tragic confrontation of two outstanding people", both deserved respect, because "each of them was certain he had right on his side and was morally obligated to go to the end in the name of truth." While Sakharov strongly disagreed with Teller over nuclear testing in the atmosphere and the Strategic Defense Initiative, he believed that American academics had been unfair to Teller's resolve to get the H-bomb for the United States since "all steps by the Americans of a temporary or permanent rejection of developing thermonuclear weapons would have been seen either as a clever feint, or as the manifestation of stupidity. In both cases, the reaction would have been the same – avoid the trap and immediately take advantage of the enemy's stupidity."

Sakharov never felt that by creating nuclear weapons he had "known sin", in Oppenheimer's expression. He later wrote:

After more than forty years, we have had no third world war, and the balance of nuclear terror ... may have helped to prevent one. But I am not at all sure of this; back then, in those long-gone years, the question didn't even arise. What most troubles me now is the instability of the balance, the extreme peril of the current situation, the appalling waste of the arms race ... Each of us has a responsibility to think about this in global terms, with tolerance, trust, and candor, free from ideological dogmatism, parochial interests, or national egotism."

— Andrei Sakharov

=== Support for peaceful use of nuclear technology ===
In 1950 he proposed an idea for a controlled nuclear fusion reactor, the tokamak, based on Oleg Lavrentiev's idea. Sakharov, in association with Tamm, proposed confining extremely hot ionized plasma by torus shaped magnetic fields for controlling thermonuclear fusion that led to the development of the tokamak device.

=== Magneto-implosive generators ===
In 1951 he invented and tested the first explosively pumped flux compression generators, compressing magnetic fields by explosives. He called these devices MK (for MagnetoKumulative) generators. The radial MK-1 produced a pulsed magnetic field of 25 megagauss (2500 teslas). The resulting helical MK-2 generated 1000 million amperes in 1953.

Sakharov then tested a MK-driven "plasma cannon" where a small aluminum ring was vaporized by huge eddy currents into a stable, self-confined toroidal plasmoid and was accelerated to 100 km/s. Sakharov later suggested replacing the copper coil in MK generators with a large superconductor solenoid to magnetically compress and focus underground nuclear explosions into a shaped charge effect. He theorized this could focus 10^{23} protons per second on a 1 mm^{2} surface.

=== Particle physics and cosmology ===
After 1965 Sakharov returned to fundamental science and began working on particle physics and physical cosmology.

2D didactic image of Sakharov's model of the universe with reversal of the arrow of time

He tried to explain the baryon asymmetry of the universe; in that regard, he was the first to give a theoretical motivation for proton decay. Proton decay was suggested by Eugene Wigner in 1949 and 1952.

Proton decay experiments had been performed since 1954 already. Sakharov was the first to consider CPT-symmetric events occurring before the Big Bang:

We can visualize that neutral spinless maximons (or photons) are produced at ''t'' < 0 from contracting matter having an excess of antiquarks, that they pass "one through the other" at the instant ''t'' = 0 when the density is infinite, and decay with an excess of quarks when ''t'' > 0, realizing total CPT symmetry of the universe. All the phenomena at t < 0 are assumed in this hypothesis to be CPT reflections of the phenomena at t > 0.

His legacy in this domain are the famous conditions named after him: Baryon number violation, C-symmetry and CP-symmetry violation, and interactions out of thermal equilibrium.

Sakharov was also interested in explaining why the curvature of the universe is so small. This led him to consider cyclic models, where the universe oscillates between contraction and expansion phases. In those models, after a certain number of cycles the curvature naturally becomes infinite even if it had not started this way: Sakharov considered three starting points, a flat universe with a slightly negative cosmological constant, a universe with a positive curvature and a zero cosmological constant, and a universe with a negative curvature and a slightly negative cosmological constant. Those last two models feature what Sakharov calls a reversal of the time arrow, which can be summarized as follows: He considers times t > 0 after the initial Big Bang singularity at t = 0 (which he calls "Friedman singularity" and denotes Φ) as well as times t < 0 before that singularity. He then assumes that entropy increases when time increases for t > 0 as well as when time decreases for t < 0, which constitutes his reversal of time. Then he considers the case when the universe at t < 0 is the image of the universe at t > 0 under CPT symmetry but also the case when it is not so: the universe has a non-zero CPT charge at t = 0 in this case. Sakharov considers a variant of this model where the reversal of the time arrow occurs at a point of maximum entropy instead of happening at the singularity. In those models there is no dynamic interaction between the universe at t < 0 and t > 0.

In his first model the two universes did not interact, except via local matter accumulation whose density and pressure become high enough to connect the two sheets through a bridge without spacetime between them, but with a continuity of geodesics beyond the Schwarzschild radius with no singularity, allowing an exchange of matter between the two conjugated sheets, based on an idea after Igor Dmitriyevich Novikov. Novikov called such singularities a collapse and an anticollapse, which are an alternative to the couple black hole and white hole in the wormhole model. Sakharov also proposed the idea of induced gravity as an alternative theory of quantum gravity.

=== Turn to activism ===
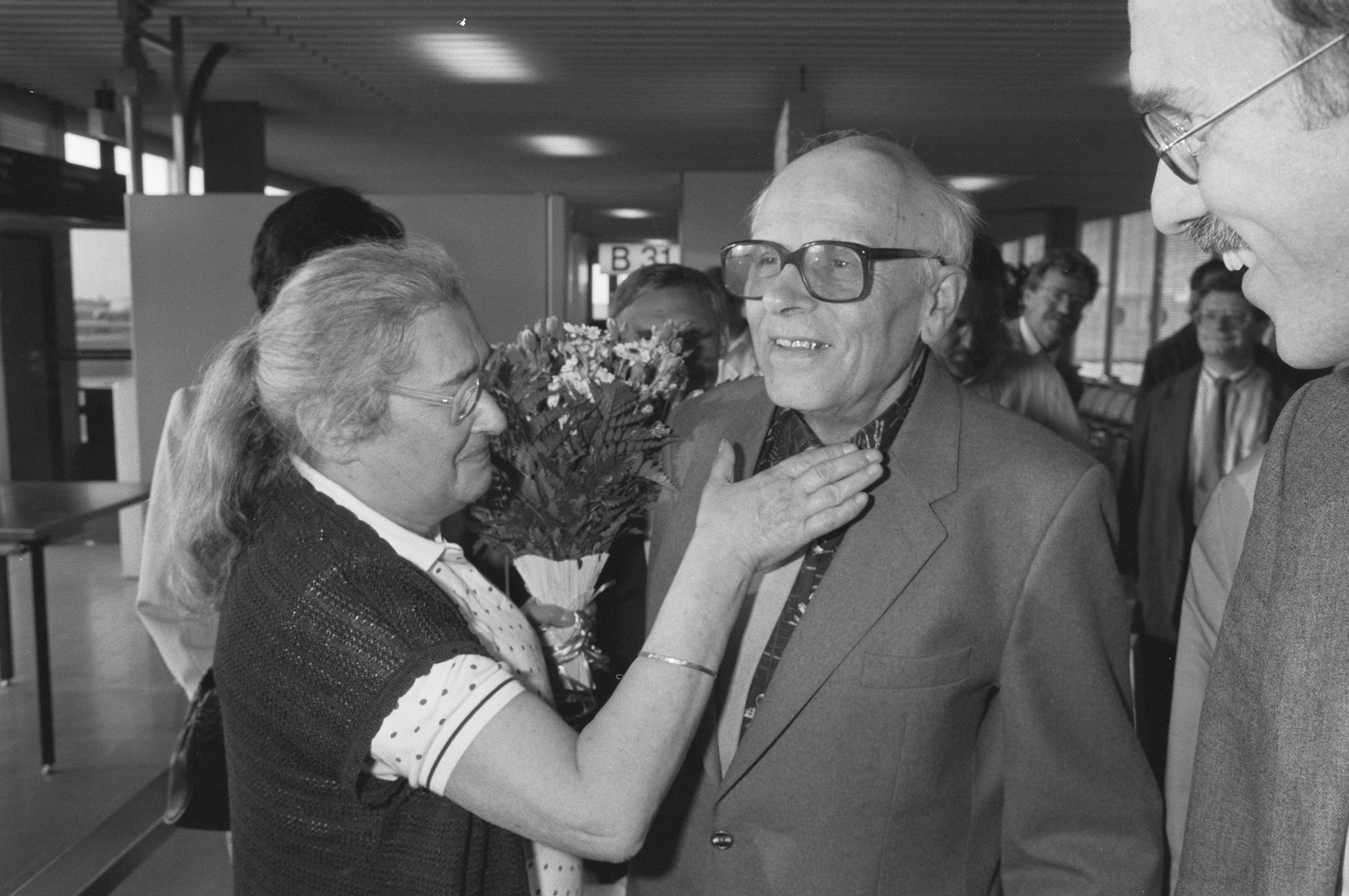
Sakharov and Bonner in 1989

Since the late 1950s Sakharov had become concerned about the moral and political implications of his work. Politically active during the 1960s, Sakharov was against nuclear proliferation. Pushing for the end of atmospheric tests, he played a role in the 1963 Partial Test Ban Treaty, signed in Moscow.

Sakharov was also involved in an event with political consequences in 1964, when the Soviet Academy of Sciences nominated for full membership Nikolai Nuzhdin, a follower of Trofim Lysenko (initiator of the Stalin-supported anti-genetics campaign Lysenkoism). Contrary to normal practice, Sakharov, a member of the academy, publicly spoke out against full membership for Nuzhdin and held him responsible for "the defamation, firing, arrest, even death, of many genuine scientists." In the end, Nuzhdin was not elected, but the episode prompted Nikita Khrushchev to order the KGB to gather compromising material on Sakharov. In 1966 Sakharov was one of the signatories on the Letter of the Twenty Five regarding the inadmissibility of "partial or indirect rehabilitation of Joseph Stalin".

The major turn in Sakharov's political evolution came in 1967, when anti-ballistic missile defense became a key issue in US–Soviet relations. In a secret detailed letter to the Soviet leadership of July 21, 1967, Sakharov explained the need to "take the Americans at their word" and accept their proposal for a "bilateral rejection by the USA and the Soviet Union of the development of antiballistic missile defense" because an arms race in the new technology would otherwise increase the likelihood of nuclear war. He also asked permission to publish his manuscript, which accompanied the letter, in a newspaper to explain the dangers posed by that kind of defense. The government ignored his letter and refused to let him initiate a public discussion of ABMs in the Soviet press.

Since 1967, after the Six-Day War and the beginning of the Arab–Israeli conflict, he actively supported Israel, as he reported more than once in the press, and also maintained friendly relations with refuseniks who later made aliyah.

In May 1968, Sakharov completed an essay, "Reflections on Progress, Peaceful Coexistence, and Intellectual Freedom". He described the anti-ballistic missile defense as a major threat of world nuclear war. After the essay was circulated in samizdat and then published outside the Soviet Union, Sakharov was banned from conducting any military-related research and returned to FIAN to study fundamental theoretical physics.

For 12 years, until his exile to Gorky (Nizhny Novgorod) in January 1980, Sakharov assumed the role of a widely recognized and open dissident in Moscow. He stood vigil outside closed courtrooms, wrote appeals on behalf of more than 200 individual prisoners, and continued to write essays about the need for democratization.

In 1970, Sakharov was among the three founding members of the Committee on Human Rights in the USSR, along with Valery Chalidze and Andrei Tverdokhlebov. The Committee wrote appeals, collected signatures for petitions and succeeded in affiliating with several international human rights organizations. Its work was the subject of many KGB reports and brought Sakharov under increasing pressure from the government.

Sakharov married a fellow human rights activist, Yelena Bonner, in 1972.

By 1973, Sakharov was meeting regularly with Western correspondents and holding press conferences in his apartment. He appealed to the US Congress to approve the 1974 Jackson-Vanik Amendment to a trade bill, which linked trade tariffs to the Kremlin's willingness to allow freer emigration for Soviet Jews.

=== Attacked by Soviet establishment from 1972 ===
In 1972, Sakharov became the target of sustained pressure from his fellow scientists in the Soviet Academy of Sciences and the Soviet press. The writer Aleksandr Solzhenitsyn came to his defence.

In 1973 and 1974, the Soviet media campaign continued, targeting both Sakharov and Solzhenitsyn for their pro-Western, anti-socialist positions.

Sakharov later described that it took "years" for him to "understand how much substitution, deceit, and lack of correspondence with reality there was" in the Soviet ideals. "At first I thought, despite everything that I saw with my own eyes, that the Soviet State was a breakthrough into the future, a kind of prototype for all countries". Then he came, in his words, to "the theory of symmetry: all governments and regimes to a first approximation are bad, all peoples are oppressed, and all are threatened by common dangers.":

...symmetry between a cancer cell and a normal one. Yet our state is similar to a cancer cell – with its messianism and expansionism, its totalitarian suppression of dissent, the authoritarian structure of power, with a total absence of public control in the most important decisions in domestic and foreign policy, a closed society that does not inform its citizens of anything substantial, closed to the outside world, without freedom of travel or the exchange of information.

Sakharov's ideas on social development led him to put forward the principle of human rights as a new basis of all politics. In his works, he declared that "the principle 'what is not prohibited is allowed' should be understood literally", and defied what he saw as unwritten ideological rules imposed by the Communist Party on the society in spite of a democratic Soviet Constitution (1936):

I am no volunteer priest of the idea, but simply a man with an unusual fate. I am against all kinds of self-immolation (for myself and for others, including the people closest to me).

In a letter written from exile, he cheered up a fellow physicist and free market advocate with the words: "Fortunately, the future is unpredictable and also – because of quantum effects – uncertain." For Sakharov, the indeterminacy of the future supported his belief that he could and should take personal responsibility for it.

=== Nobel Peace Prize (1975) ===
In 1973, Sakharov was nominated for the Nobel Peace Prize, and in 1974, he was awarded the Prix mondial Cino Del Duca.

Sakharov was awarded the Nobel Peace Prize in 1975. The Norwegian Nobel Committee called him "a spokesman for the conscience of mankind". In the words of the Nobel Committee's citation: "In a convincing manner Sakharov has emphasised that Man's inviolable rights provide the only safe foundation for genuine and enduring international cooperation."

Sakharov was not allowed to leave the Soviet Union to collect the prize. His wife, Yelena Bonner, read his speech at the ceremony in Oslo, Norway. On the day the prize was awarded, Sakharov was in Vilnius, where the human rights activist Sergei Kovalev was being tried. In his Nobel lecture, "Peace, Progress, Human Rights", Sakharov called for an end to the arms race, greater respect for the environment, international cooperation, and universal respect for human rights. He included a list of prisoners of conscience and political prisoners in the Soviet Union and stated that he shared the prize with them.

By 1976, the head of the KGB, Yuri Andropov, was prepared to call Sakharov "Domestic Enemy Number One" before a group of KGB officers.

=== Internal exile (1980–1986) ===
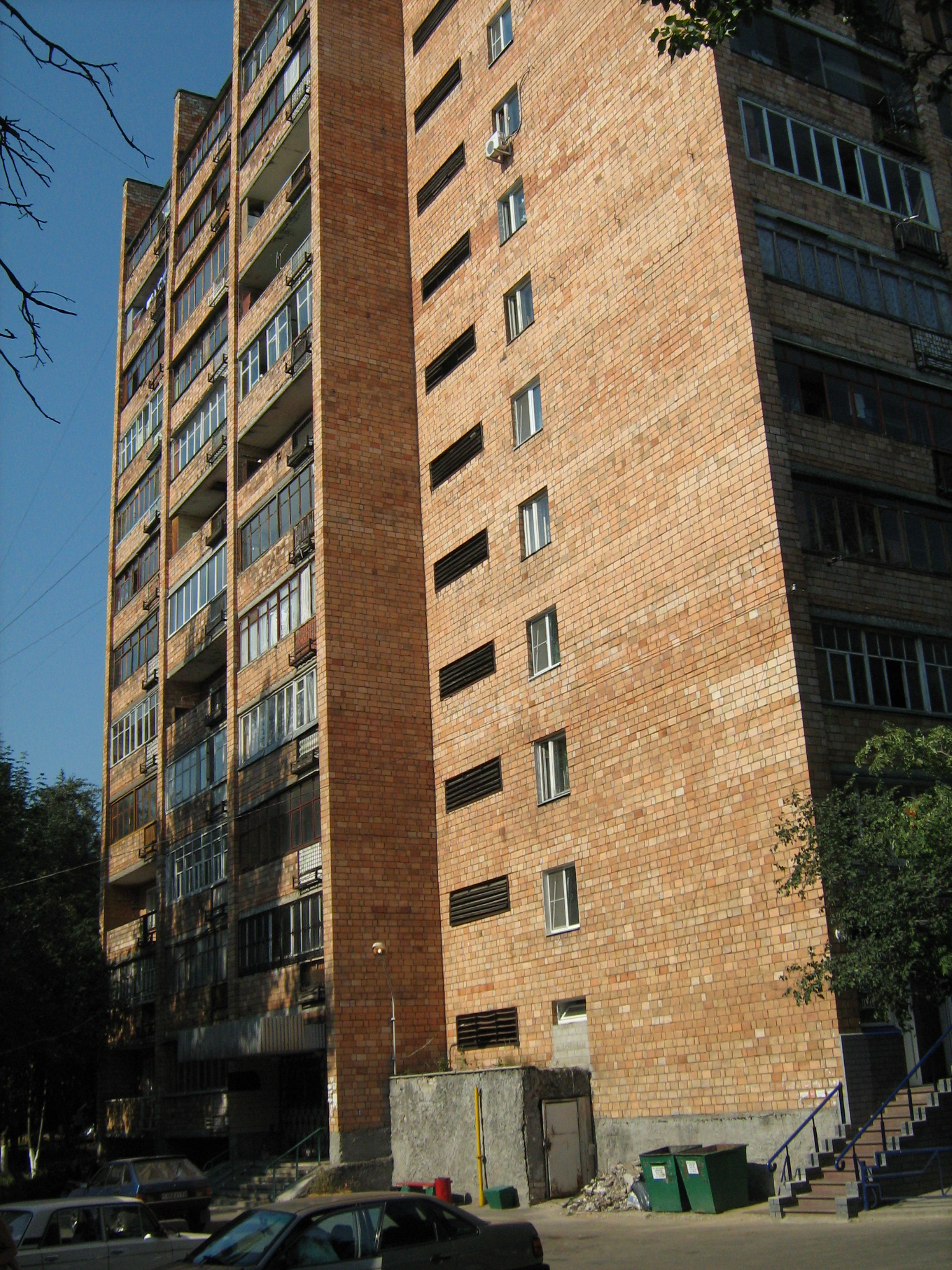
The apartment building in Gagarina Avenue 214, Scherbinki district of Nizhny Novgorod where Sakharov lived in exile from 1980 to 1986. His apartment is now a museum.

Sakharov was arrested on 22 January 1980, following his public protests against the Soviet intervention in Afghanistan in 1979, and was sent to the city of Gorky, now Nizhny Novgorod, a city that was off limits to foreigners.

Between 1980 and 1986, Sakharov was kept under Soviet police surveillance. In his memoirs, he mentioned that their apartment in Gorky was repeatedly subjected to searches and heists. Sakharov was named the 1980 Humanist of the Year by the American Humanist Association.

In May 1984, Yelena Bonner was detained, and Sakharov began a hunger strike, demanding permission for his wife to travel to the United States for heart surgery. He was hospitalized, force-fed, and held in isolation for four months. In August 1984, Bonner was sentenced by a court to five years of exile in Gorky.

In April 1985, Sakharov started a new hunger strike for his wife to travel abroad for medical treatment. He again was taken to a hospital and force-fed. In August, the Politburo discussed what to do about Sakharov. He remained in the hospital until October 1985, when his wife was allowed to travel to the United States. She had heart surgery in the United States and returned to Gorky in June 1986.

In December 1985, the European Parliament established the Sakharov Prize for Freedom of Thought, to be given annually for outstanding contributions to human rights.

On 19 December 1986, Mikhail Gorbachev, who had initiated the policies of perestroika and glasnost, called Sakharov to tell him that he and his wife could return to Moscow.

=== Political leader ===
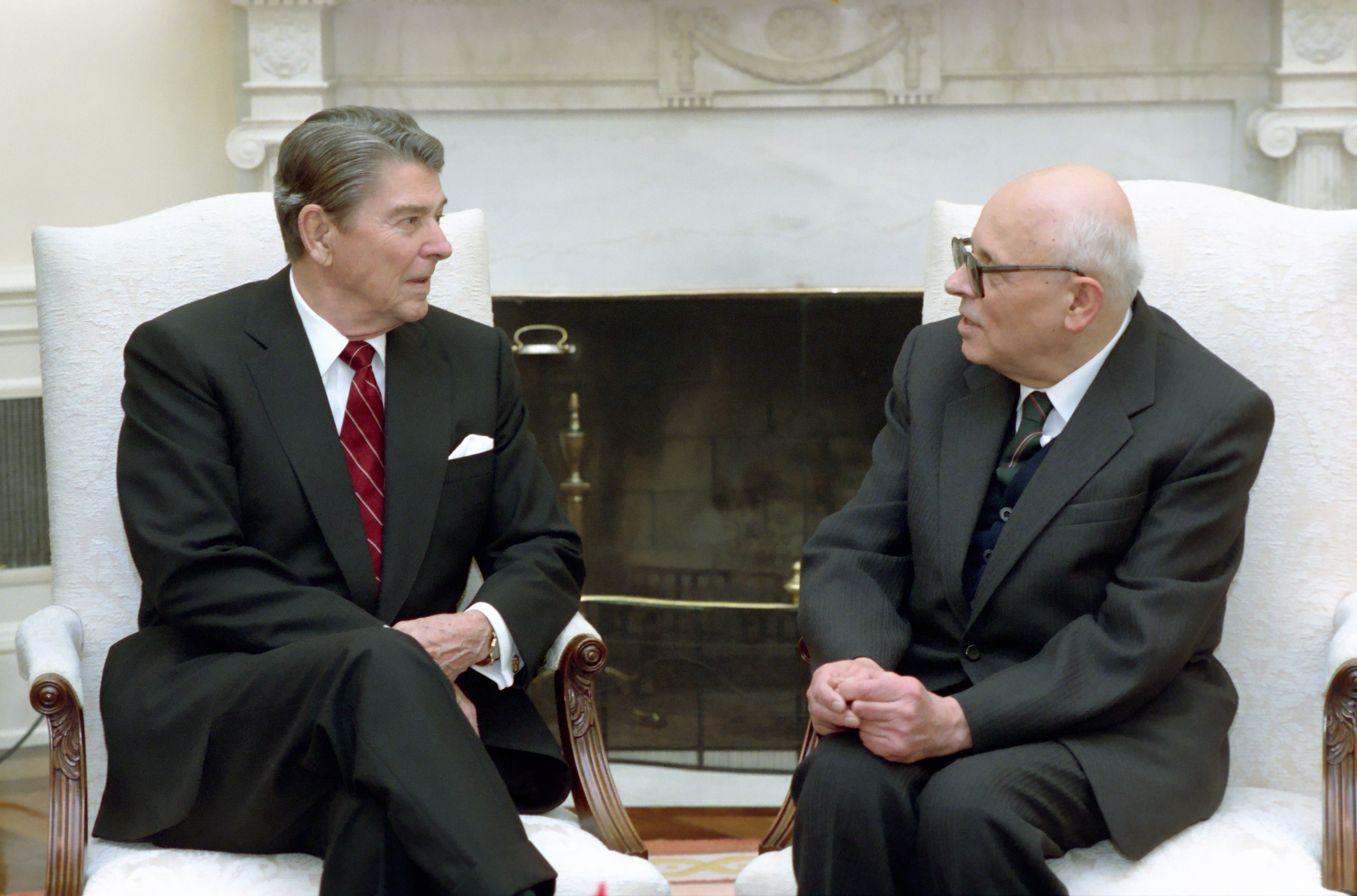
Sakharov with U.S. President Ronald Reagan in 1988

In 1988, Sakharov was given the International Humanist Award by the International Humanist and Ethical Union. He helped to initiate the first independent legal political organizations and became prominent in the Soviet Union's growing political opposition. In March 1989, Sakharov was elected to the new parliament, the All-Union Congress of People's Deputies and co-led the democratic opposition, the Inter-Regional Deputies Group. In November the head of the KGB reported to Gorbachev on Sakharov's encouragement and support for the coal miners' strike in Vorkuta.

In December 1988, Sakharov visited Armenia and Azerbaijan on a fact-finding mission. He concluded, "For Azerbaijan the issue of Karabakh is a matter of ambition, for the Armenians of Karabakh, it is a matter of life and death".

=== Death ===
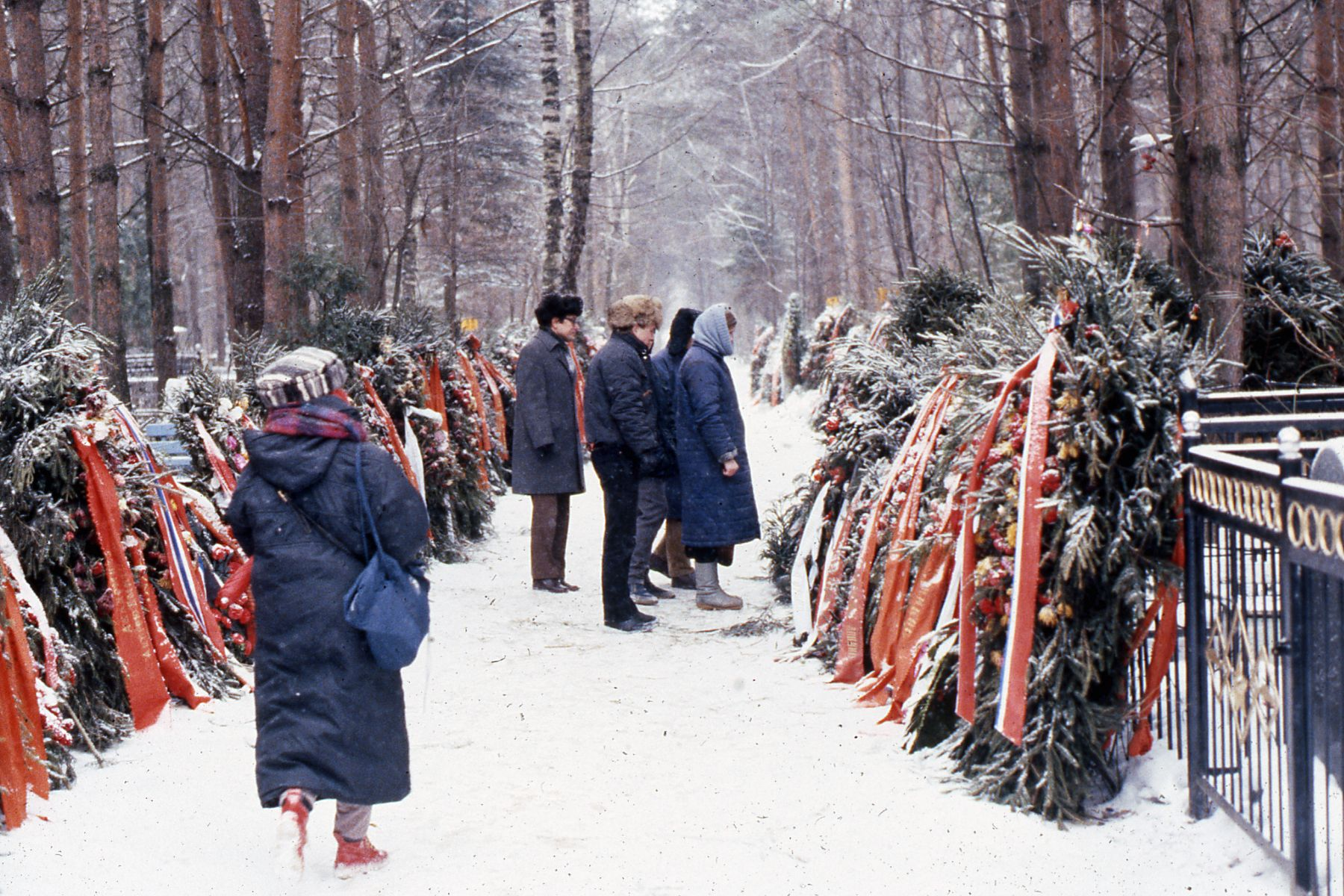
Sakharov's grave, January 1990

Soon after 9 p.m. on 14 December 1989, Sakharov went to his study to take a nap before preparing an important speech he was to deliver the next day in the Congress. His wife went to wake him at 11 p.m. as he had requested but she found Sakharov dead on the floor. According to the notes of Yakov Rapoport, a senior pathologist present at the autopsy, it is most likely that Sakharov died of an arrhythmia consequent to dilated cardiomyopathy at the age of 68. He is interred in the Vostryakovskoye Cemetery in Moscow.

== Influence ==
=== Memorial prizes ===
The Sakharov Prize for Freedom of Thought was established in 1988 by the European Parliament in his honour, and is the highest tribute to human rights endeavours awarded by the European Union. It is awarded annually by the parliament to "those who carry the spirit of Soviet dissident Andrei Sakharov"; to "Laureates who, like Sakharov, dedicate their lives to peaceful struggle for human rights."

An Andrei Sakharov prize has also been awarded by the American Physical Society every second year since 2006 "to recognize outstanding leadership and/or achievements of scientists in upholding human rights".

The Andrei Sakharov Prize for Writer's Civic Courage was established in October 1990.

In 2004, with the approval of Yelena Bonner, an annual Sakharov Prize for journalism was established for reporters and commentators in Russia. Funded by former Soviet dissident Pyotr Vins, now a businessman in the US, the prize is administered by the Glasnost Defence Foundation in Moscow. The prize "for journalism as an act of conscience" has been won over the years by famous journalists such as Anna Politkovskaya and young reporters and editors working far from Russia's media capital, Moscow. The 2015 winner was Yelena Kostyuchenko.

=== Andrei Sakharov Archives and Human Rights Center ===
The Andrei Sakharov Archives and Human Rights Center, established at Brandeis University in 1993, are now housed at Harvard University. The documents from that archive were published by the Yale University Press in 2005. These documents are available online.

Most of documents of the archive are letters from the head of the KGB to the Central Committee about activities of Soviet dissidents and recommendations about the interpretation in newspapers. The letters cover the period from 1968 to 1991 (Brezhnev stagnation). The documents characterize not only Sakharov's activity, but that of other dissidents, as well as that of highest-position apparatchiks and the KGB. No Russian equivalent of the KGB archive is available.

== Legacy and remembrance ==
=== Places ===
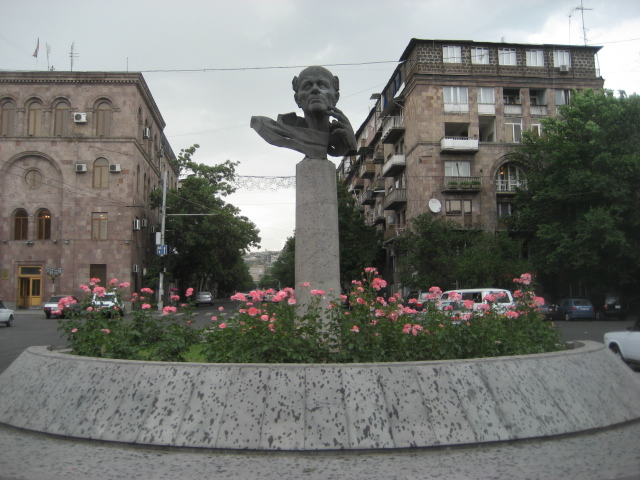
A statue of Andrei Sakharov in Yerevan, Armenia

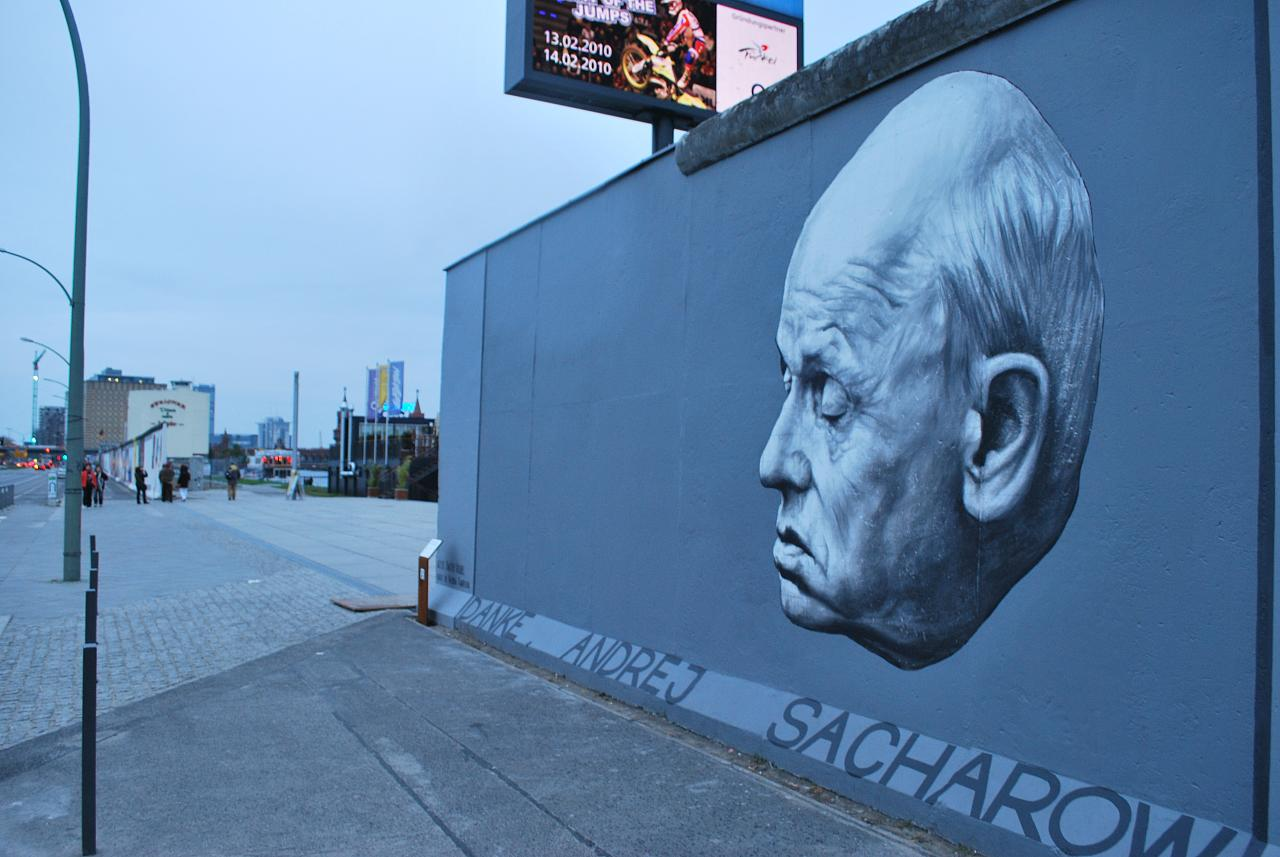
"Thank you Andrei Sakharov" mural on the Berlin Wall

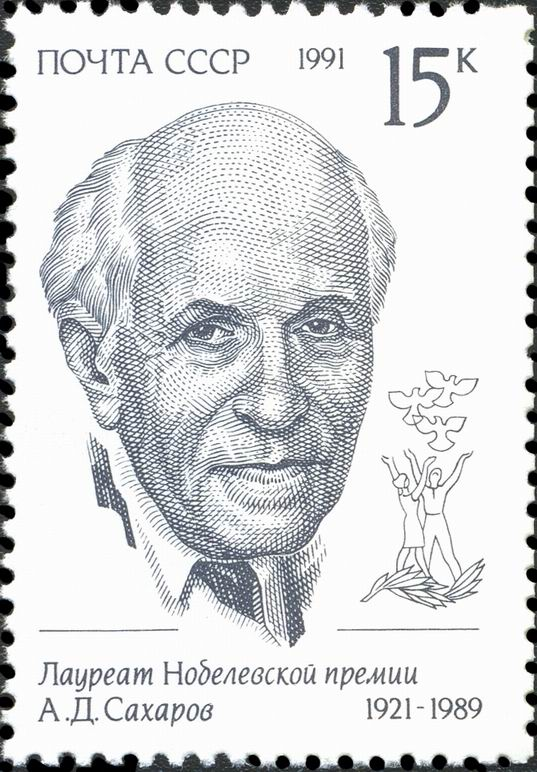
Andrei Sakharov on Soviet Nobel Peace Prize winners, the USSR stamp issued on 14 May 1991

- A public Sakharov Center operated in Moscow until 2023.
- During the 1980s, the block of 16th Street NW between L and M streets, in front of the Soviet embassy in Washington, D.C. (which later became the Russian ambassador's residence) was renamed "Andrei Sakharov Plaza" as a form of protest against his 1980 arrest and detention.
- In Yerevan, the capital of Armenia, Sakharov Square, located in the heart of the city, is named after him.
- The Sakharov Gardens (est. 1990) are located at the entrance to Jerusalem, Israel, off the Jerusalem–Tel Aviv Highway. There is also a street named after him in Haifa, near the Haifa Hof HaCarmel train station.
- In Nizhny Novgorod, there is a Sakharov Museum in the apartment on the first floor of the 12-storeyed house where the Sakharov family lived for seven years; in 2014 his monument was erected near the house.
- In Saint Petersburg, his monument stands in Sakharov Square, and there is a Sakharov Park.
- In 1979, an asteroid, 1979 Sakharov, was named after him.
- A public square in Vilnius in front of the Press House is named after Sakharov. The square was named on 16 March 1991, as the Press House was still occupied by the Soviet Army.
- Andreja Saharova iela in the district of Pļavnieki in Riga, Latvia, is named after Sakharov.
- Andreij-Sacharow-Platz in downtown Nuremberg is named in honour of Sakharov.
- In Belarus, International Sakharov Environmental University was named after him.
- Intersection of Ventura Blvd and Laurel Canyon Blvd in Studio City, Los Angeles, is named Andrei Sakharov Square.
- In Arnhem, the bridge over the Nederrijn is called the Andrej Sacharovbrug.
- The Andrej Sacharovweg is a street in Assen, Netherlands. There are also streets named in his honour in other places in the Netherlands such as Amsterdam, Amstelveen, The Hague, Hellevoetsluis, Leiden, Purmerend, Rotterdam, Utrecht
- A street in Copenhagen, Denmark.
- Quai Andreï Sakharov in Tournai, Belgium, is named in honour of Sakharov.
- In Poland, streets named in his honour in Warsaw, Łódź and Kraków.
- Andreï Sakharov Boulevard in the district of Mladost in Sofia, Bulgaria, is named after him.
- In New York City, a street sign at the southwest corner of Third Avenue and 67th Street in Manhattan reads Sakharov-Bonner Corner, in honor of Sakharov and his wife, Yelena Bonner. The corner is just down the block from the Soviet Mission to the United Nations (which later became the Russian mission) and was the scene of repeated anti-Soviet demonstrations.
- In Chişinău, the capital of Moldova, there is Academician Andrei Sakharov street.

=== Media ===
- In the 1984 made-for-TV film Sakharov starring Jason Robards.
- In the television series Star Trek: The Next Generation, one of the Enterprise-D's Shuttlecraft is named after Sakharov, and is featured prominently in several episodes. This follows the Star Trek tradition of naming Shuttlecraft after prominent scientists, and particularly in The Next Generation, physicists.
- The fictitious interplanetary spacecraft Cosmonaut Alexei Leonov from the novel 2010: Odyssey Two by Arthur C. Clarke is powered by a "Sakharov drive". The novel was published in 1982, when Sakharov was in exile in Nizhny Novgorod, and was dedicated both to Sakharov and to Alexei Leonov.
- Russian singer Alexander Gradsky wrote and performed the song "Памяти А. Д. Сахарова" ("In memory of Andrei Sakharov"), which features on his Live In "Russia" 2 (Живем в "России" 2) CD.
- The faction leader of the Ecologists in the PC game S.T.A.L.K.E.R.: Shadow of Chernobyl and its prequel is a scientist named Professor Sakharov.

== Honours and awards ==
- Hero of Socialist Labour (three times: 12 August 1953; 20 June 1956; 7 March 1962).
- Four Orders of Lenin.
- Lenin Prize (1956).
- Stalin Prize (1953).
- Elected member of the American Academy of Arts and Sciences (1969)
- Elected member of the National Academy of Sciences (1973)

In 1980, Sakharov was stripped of all Soviet awards for "anti-Soviet activities". Later, during glasnost, he declined the return of his awards and, consequently, Mikhail Gorbachev did not sign the necessary decree.

- Prix mondial Cino Del Duca (1974).
- Nobel Peace Prize (1975).
- Elected member of the American Philosophical Society (1978)
- Laurea Honoris Causa of the Sapienza University of Rome (1980).
- Grand Cross of Order of the Cross of Vytis (posthumously on January 8, 2003).

== Bibliography ==
=== Books ===
- Sakharov, Andrei (1974). Sakharov speaks. London: Collins and Harvill Press. ISBN 978-0-00-262755-9.
- Sakharov, Andrei (1975). My country and the world. Knopf. ISBN 978-0-394-40226-0.
- Sakharov, Andrei (1978). Alarm and hope. The world-renowned Nobel laureate and political dissident speaks out on human rights, disarmament, and détente. Knopf. ISBN 978-0-394-50369-1.
- Sakharov, Andrei (1982). Collected scientific works. Marcel Dekker Inc. ISBN 978-0-8247-1714-8.
- Sakharov, Andrei (1990). Memoirs. Knopf. ISBN 978-0394537405.
- Sakharov, Andrei (1991). Moscow and beyond: 1986 to 1989. Knopf Doubleday Publishing Group. ISBN 978-0-394-58797-4.
- Сахаров, Андрей (1996). Воспоминания. В 2 томах [Memoirs. In 2 volumes] (in Russian). Vol. 1. Moscow: Права человека. ISBN 978-5-7712-0011-8.
- Сахаров, Андрей (1996). Воспоминания. В 2 томах [Memoirs. In 2 volumes] (in Russian). Vol. 2. Moscow: Права человека. ISBN 978-5-7712-0026-2.

=== Articles and interviews ===
- Sakharov, Andrei (1968). Thoughts on progress, peaceful coexistence and intellectual freedom. Foreign Affairs Publishing Company. ISBN 978-0-900380-03-7.
- Sakharov; Andrei (July 22, 1968). "Thoughts on progress, peaceful coexistence and intellectual freedom" (PDF). The New York Times. Archived (PDF) from the original on January 13, 2013.
- Sakharov, Andrei (Spring 1969). "Here and there: the threat of nuclear war". American Scientist. 57 (1): 167–171. JSTOR 27828445.
- Sakharov, Andrei (1974). О письме Александра Солженицына "Вождям Советского Союза" [On Alexander Solzhenitsyn's "A Letter to the Soviet Leaders"] (in Russian). New York: Khronika. OCLC 2326203.
- Sakharov, Andrei; Tverdokhlebov, Andrei; Albrecht, Vladimir (May 28, 1974). "USSR. The chronicle of current events". Index on Censorship. 3 (3): 87. doi:10.1080/03064227408532355. S2CID 220923855.
- Sakharov, Andrei (November 1975). "The need for an open world: Andrei Sakharov calls on scientists to intensify the campaign for a nuclear weapons ban and full disarmament". Bulletin of the Atomic Scientists: 8–9. doi:10.1080/00963402.1975.11458291.
- Sakharov, Andrei; Turchin, Valentin; Medvedev, Roy (June 6, 1970). "The need for democratization". The Saturday Review: 26–27.
- Sakharov, Andrei; Turchin, Valentin; Medvedev, Roy (Summer 1970). "An open letter". Survey: 160–170.
- Sakharov, Andrei (Summer 1972). "Memorandum". Survey: 223–233.
- Sakharov, Andrei (Spring 1973). "Statement by the Human Rights Committee". Survey: 271–273.
- Sakharov, Andrei (December 1973). "Interview with Swedish RTV". Index on Censorship. 2 (4): 13–17. doi:10.1080/03064227308532263. S2CID 146534370.
- Sakharov, Andrei (December 1973). "The Deputy Prosecutor-General and I". Index on Censorship. 2 (4): 19–23. doi:10.1080/03064227308532264. S2CID 145423521.
- Sakharov, Andrei (December 1973). "Press conference". Index on Censorship. 2 (4): 25–29. doi:10.1080/03064227308532265. S2CID 220932382.
- Sakharov, Andrei (December 1973). "Reply to critics". Index on Censorship. 2 (4): 29–30. doi:10.1080/03064227308532266. S2CID 220929169.
- Sakharov, Andrei (January–March 1974). "Reply to oppression". Rivista di Studi Politici Internazionali. 41 (1): 47–54. JSTOR 42733796.
- Sakharov, Andrei (March 21, 1974). "How I came to dissent". The New York Review of Books. 21 (4).
- Sakharov, Andrei (June 13, 1974). "In answer to Solzhenitsyn". The New York Review of Books. 21 (10).
- Sakharov, Andrei (March 1975). "Sakharov's statement on Jackson amendment". Index on Censorship. 4 (1): 73–74. doi:10.1080/03064227508532405. S2CID 145693276.
- Sakharov, Andrei (June 1976). "Peace, progress and human rights". Index on Censorship. 5 (2): 3–9. doi:10.1080/03064227608532514. S2CID 144812636.
- Sakharov, Andrei (February 9, 1978). "The death penalty". The New York Review of Books. 25 (1).
- Sakharov, Andrei (February 1978). "Letter from Sakharov and Meiman". Nature. 271 (5645): 499. Bibcode:1978Natur.271..499S. doi:10.1038/271499c0.
- Sakharov, Andrei (Fall 1978). "The human rights movement in the USSR and Eastern Europe: its goals, significance, and difficulties". Trialogue (19): 4–7, 26–27.
- Sakharov, Andrei (December 1980). "USSR: Sakharov's plea for poets". Index on Censorship. 9 (6): 64. doi:10.1080/03064228008533146. S2CID 159662308.
- Sakharov, Andrei (May 1981). "The responsibility of scientists". Nature. 291 (5812): 184–185. Bibcode:1981Natur.291..184S. doi:10.1038/291184a0. PMID 7231537.
- Sakharov, Andrei (June 1981). "The social responsibility of scientists". Physics Today. 34 (6): 25–30. Bibcode:1981PhT....34f..25S. doi:10.1063/1.2914603. ISSN 0031-9228.
- Sakharov, Andrei (October 1981). "The responsibility of scientists". Nature. 25 (10): 18–21. Bibcode:1981Natur.291..184S. doi:10.1038/291184a0. ISSN 0033-5002. PMID 7231537.
- Sakharov, Andrei (Fall 1981). "An autobiographical note". The Partisan Review: 511–513.
- Sakharov, Andrei (January 21, 1982). "Letter to my foreign colleagues". The New York Review of Books. 28 (21).
- Sakharov, Andrei; Meiman, Naum (March–April 1982). "The plight of Yuri Orlov". Harvard International Review. 4 (6): 50. JSTOR 42762207.
- Sakharov, Andrei (Summer 1982). "An appeal". The Partisan Review: 480–482.
- Sakharov, Andrei (June 1983). "A message from Gorky". Bulletin of the Atomic Scientists. 39 (6): 2–3. Bibcode:1983BuAtS..39f...2S. doi:10.1080/00963402.1983.11458999.
- Sakharov, Andrei (Summer 1983). "The danger of thermonuclear war. An open letter to Dr. Sidney Drell" (PDF). Foreign Affairs. 61 (5): 1001–1016. doi:10.2307/20041632. JSTOR 20041632. Archived (PDF) from the original on March 16, 2016.
- Sakharov, Andrei (July 21, 1983). "A reply to slander". The New York Review of Books. 30 (12).
- Sakharov, Andrei (March 1, 1984). "A letter to my scientific colleagues". The New York Review of Books. 31 (3).
- Sakharov, Andrei (March 16, 1987). "Of arms and reforms". Time.
- Sakharov, Andrei (August 13, 1987). "On accepting a prize". The New York Review of Books. 34 (13).
- Sakharov, Andrei (February 25, 1988). "A man of universal interests". Nature. 331 (6158): 671–672. Bibcode:1988Natur.331..671S. doi:10.1038/331671a0. S2CID 4319051.
- Sakharov, Andrei (December 22, 1988). "On Gorbachev: a talk with Andrei Sakharov". The New York Review of Books. 35 (20).
- Sajarov, Andrei; Bonner, Elena (1989). "Al simposio de Madrid sobre las relaciones comerciales y económicas Este-Oeste" [Madrid symposium on East-West trade relations and economics]. Política Exterior (in Spanish). 3 (12): 45–47. JSTOR 20642878.
- Sakharov, Andrei (August 17, 1989). "A speech to the People's Congress". The New York Review of Books. 36 (13): 25–26.
- Sakharov, Andrei (1990). "We cannot do without nuclear power plants, but ...". World Marxist Review. 33: 21–22. ISSN 0043-8642.
- Sakharov, Andrei (May 21, 1990). "Sakharov: Sakharov and Solzhenitsyn: a difference in principle". Time.
- Sakharov, Andrei (May 21, 1990). "Sakharov: years in exile". Time.
- Sakharov, Andrei (July 1999). "Lecture in Lyons: science and freedom". Physics Today. 52 (7): 22–24. Bibcode:1999PhT....52g..22S. doi:10.1063/1.882746. ISSN 0031-9228.

== See also ==
- Sakharov conditions
- Sakharov Prize
- List of peace activists
- Natan Sharansky
- Stanislaw Ulam
- Omid Kokabee
- Mordechai Vanunu
