= Committee on Human Rights in the USSR =

Soviet dissident organization

- Комитет прав человека в СССР
- Formation: 4 November 1970
- Founder: Valery Chalidze, Andrei Sakharov, Andrei Tverdokhlebov
- Founded at: Moscow, Russia
- Type: Association, NGO
- Fields: Human rights monitoring

The Committee on Human Rights in the USSR (Russian: Комите́т прав челове́ка в СССР) was founded in 1970 by dissident Valery Chalidze together with Andrei Sakharov and Andrei Tverdokhlebov.

== Members ==
Valery Chalidze was a writer and dissident who published the samizdat journal Social Problems. Andrei Sakharov was an eminent Soviet nuclear physicist who had publicly opposed the Soviet plans for atmospheric nuclear tests. In 1968, Sakharov had published "Progress, Coexistence and Intellectual Freedom," a plea for nuclear disarmament emphasizing the role of human rights. As a result, his professorship was revoked by Soviet authorities. He became a spokesman for the human rights in the Soviet Union. The third founding member was physicist Andrey Tverdokhlebov.

Later the Committee was joined by Igor Shafarevich, a mathematician and corresponding member of the Academy of Sciences. Mathematician Aleksandr Yesenin-Volpin and physicist Boris Zukerman became legal experts for the group. Writer Aleksandr Solzhenitsyn and dissident bard Aleksandr Galich became honorary members. The Committee was also joined by Grigory Podyapolsky. Other prominent members of the Committee included Yelena Bonner and Pavel Litvinov.

== Goals ==
Unlike its predecessor, the Initiative Group for the Defense of Human Rights in the USSR, the Committee functioned within a framework defined by its founding statutes. It was defined it as "a creative association acting in accordance with the laws of the land." The goals of the committee were listed in their founding statement:

- Consultative assistance to the organs of government in the establishment and application of guarantees of human rights;
- Research into the theoretical aspects of the human rights question and into the specific nature of this question in a socialist society;
- Legal education of the public, including the publication of international and Soviet documents on human rights.

The Committee opposed secret trials, capital punishment, and punitive psychiatry. It specifically ruled out any cooperation with organizations that sought the overthrow of the Soviet state.

== Activities ==
The Committee was the first independent association in the Soviet Union to receive membership in an international organization. In June 1971, it became an affiliate of the International League of Human Rights, a nongovernmental organization with consultative status under the United Nations, and International Institute of Human Rights. It also became a member of the International Institute of Law.

The Committee was kept under constant surveillance by the KGB. Head of the KGB Yuri Andropov wrote in a report to the Central Committee of 1 March 1973: "The anti-social activities of the so-called Human Rights Committee decreased in 1972 as a result of measures taken by the KGB. These measures included compromising Chalidze's reputation, stripping him of Soviet citizenship [during his visit to the United States], and inciting disagreement and dissension among the Committee's members and sympathisers, which led to Tverdokhlebov's resignation."

According to Sakharov's memoirs, during 1973 and 1974, he, Grigory Podyapolsky and Igor Shafarevich continued to regularly meet at his apartment and continue the Committee's work on documenting human rights abuses. While several reports were produced, by then they began to feel the Committee had outlived its usefulness.

== See also ==
- Initiative Group for the Defense of Human Rights in the USSR
- Moscow Helsinki Group

== Bibliography ==
- Kline, Edward (2004). Moskovskij Komitet prav celoveka : The Moscow human rights committee. Publikacii Muzeja i obščestvennogo centra imeni Andreja Sacharova (in Russian). Lev Michajlovič Timofeev (trans.). Moskva: Prava čeloveka. ISBN 978-5-7712-0308-9.
