= Nikolai Nuzhdin =

Nikolai Ivanovich Nuzhdin
- Николай Иванович Нуждин
- Born: 17 April 1904; Pozderino, Rostov Uyezd, Yaroslavl Governorate, Russian Empire
- Died: 21 August 1972 (aged 68); Moscow, Soviet Union
- Burial place: Donskoye Cemetery
- Education: Yaroslavl Pedagogical Institute
- Known for: Support for Lysenkoism
- Scientific career
- Fields: Biology, agronomy, genetics
- Workplaces: Institute of Genetics of the USSR Academy of Sciences; Timiryazev Agricultural Academy

Nikolai Ivanovich Nuzhdin (17 April 1904 – 21 August 1972) was a Soviet biologist, agronomist, and geneticist associated with Trofim Lysenko and Lysenkoism. He was elected a corresponding member of the USSR Academy of Sciences in 1953.

== Early life and education ==
Nuzhdin was born on 17 April 1904 in the village of Pozderino in Rostov Uyezd, Yaroslavl Governorate. He graduated in 1929 from Yaroslavl Pedagogical Institute.

== Career ==
From 1935, Nuzhdin worked at the Institute of Genetics of the USSR Academy of Sciences. From 1949 to 1952, he was head of the Department of Zoology at the Timiryazev Agricultural Academy in Moscow.

On 23 October 1953, he was elected a corresponding member of the USSR Academy of Sciences.

Nuzhdin was associated with the Lysenkoist current in Soviet biology, also promoted by its supporters as Michurinist biology, which rejected Mendelian genetics in favor of environmentally directed heredity.

=== Debate with Julian Huxley ===
In 1949 the evolutionary biologist Julian Huxley published an article in Nature criticizing the political suppression of Mendelian genetics in the Soviet Union and the rise of Lysenkoism. Nuzhdin responded in the same journal in 1950, defending Lysenkoist or “Michurinist” biology and accusing Western geneticists of misrepresenting Soviet science.

In addition to exchanges in the scientific press, Nuzhdin also participated in international debates over Lysenkoism. One of the few occasions when a Western geneticist and a Soviet Lysenkoist publicly debated occurred on 20 January 1954 at a session of the Pakistan Association for the Advancement of Science in Karachi, where Nuzhdin debated Huxley.

== 1964 Academy of Sciences controversy ==
In 1964, Nuzhdin was nominated for election as a full member of the USSR Academy of Sciences. During the Academy's general assembly, Andrei Sakharov, Vladimir Engelhardt, and Igor Tamm criticized Nuzhdin for his role in Lysenkoism and its consequences for Soviet biology. In a speech to the general assembly, Sakharov accused Nuzhdin and Lysenko of contributing to the “shameful backwardness of Soviet biology” and of promoting pseudoscientific doctrines that had harmed Soviet genetics.

Nuzhdin was not elected a full member of the Academy. The episode has been discussed by historians as part of the broader decline of Lysenkoism in Soviet science.

== Death ==
Nuzhdin died on 21 August 1972 in Moscow and was buried at the Donskoye Cemetery.

== Selected publications ==
Nuzhdin's work was mainly in genetics, evolutionary theory, and radiobiology.

- Nasledstvennye izmeneniia i ontogenez ("Hereditary changes and ontogenesis"), Journal of General Biology, 1945
- Rol' gibridizatsii v izmenchivosti ("The role of hybridization in variability"), Journal of General Biology, 1946
- Kritika idealisticheskoi teorii gena ("Critique of the idealist theory of the gene"), in Against Reactionary Mendelism-Morganism, 1950
- Darvin i michurinskaia biologiia ("Darwin and Michurinist biology"), Proceedings of the USSR Academy of Sciences, Biological Series, 1952
- Sbornik rabot po radiobiologii ("Collected works on radiobiology"), ed. N. I. Nuzhdin, 1955
