= Transport in Jerusalem =

Aspect of Jerusalem

Transport in Jerusalem is characterized by a well-developed inter-city network and an emerging, developing intra-city network. Ben Gurion International Airport serves as Jerusalem's closest international airport. Egged bus lines and Israel Railways connect the city of Jerusalem to much of Israel, and a high-speed rail line to Herzliya via Ben Gurion Airport and Tel-Aviv was completed in 2018. Within the city, the roads, rather than the rails, are the primary mode of transportation.

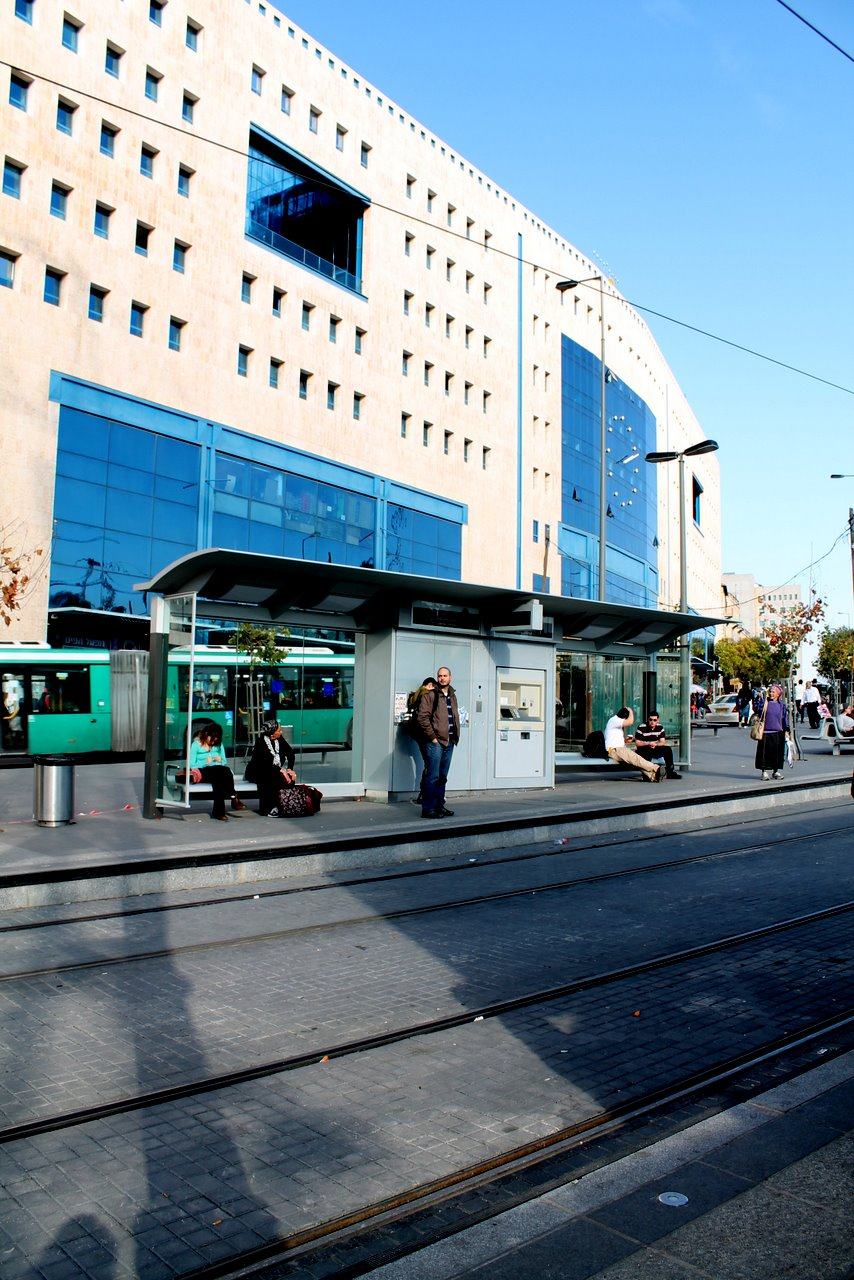
Jerusalem Central Bus Station

== Roads ==
Begin Highway (Highway 50) is the western inner city expressway in Jerusalem. It runs north to south from Atarot to Manahat (Malha), and is being extended to link further south into Highway 60 to Gush Etzion. The northern end of the highway is fed by Highway 443 from Tel Aviv and Modiin. The Atarot-Talpiot route (Highway 60) is the main route which traverses the center of the city; and Herzl Boulevard, which begins at the northern entrance of the city and continues south via Mount Herzl and the Yad Vashem Holocaust memorial. It then merges into additional routes that lead to the southwestern quarters. The Golomb-Herzog-Ben-Zvi route also links the southern quarters with the city center.

Running east through the city center, Jaffa Road connects the Jaffa Gate of the Old City as well as the central-eastern neighbourhoods and the northwestern city entrance to Highway 1. Highway 1 bypasses the city-centre to the north as Yigael Yadin Boulevard, and links Ma'ale Adummim to Begin Highway near Ramot.

Construction is progressing on parts of a 35-kilometer (22-mi) ring road around the city, fostering faster connection between the suburbs and the city center. The eastern half of the project was conceptualized decades ago, but reaction to the proposed highway is still mixed.

== Buses ==
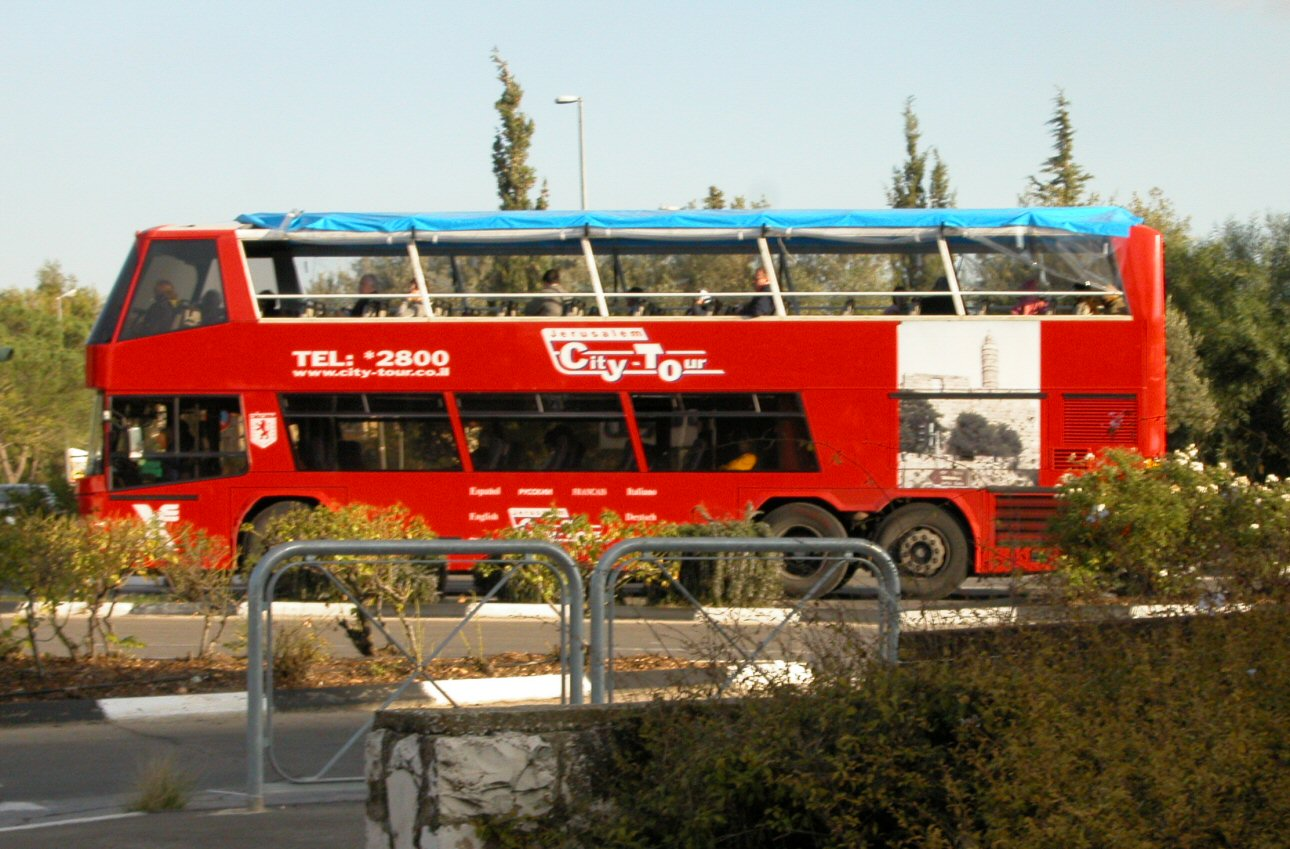
Route 99 tourist bus

Jerusalem Central Bus Station is Jerusalem's main intercity bus station. The city is served mainly by Egged buses, though as of 2009, a number of other companies are providing an increasing number of bus lines to and from the city also; as of 2009, Dan and Superbus also use the Central Bus Station. City buses in Jerusalem are run by Egged and Superbus, which runs close to 100 bus lines throughout the city and its suburbs. A map of the various lines may be accessed on MobileMe

Two joint Egged–Dan bus lines serve the Bnei Brak – Jerusalem route, while Superbus and Veolia serve Modi'in Illit and Modi'in respectively. As of December 2008, Superbus also provides all bus routes in the Jerusalem corridor, between Jerusalem and Beit Shemesh. The Illit company provides bus lines to Beitar Illit.

East Jerusalem Arab-run buses serve the city's Arab neighborhoods in Eastern Jerusalem and also some Palestinian towns in the Palestinian Authority and Israeli Arab towns. This system is based out of the East Jerusalem Central Bus Station on Sultan Suleiman Street, though buses also leave from outside the Damascus Gate of the Old City.

The Egged and the East Jerusalem Arab city bus networks are almost completely separated. There are a handful of bus stops served by both companies. Arab residents of East Jerusalem indeed use Egged buses, but Jewish residents rarely use the East Jerusalem Arab buses, in part because while Arabs of East Jerusalem occasionally visit the Jewish parts of Jerusalem, Jews do not frequently visit Jerusalem's Arab neighborhoods.

== Trains ==
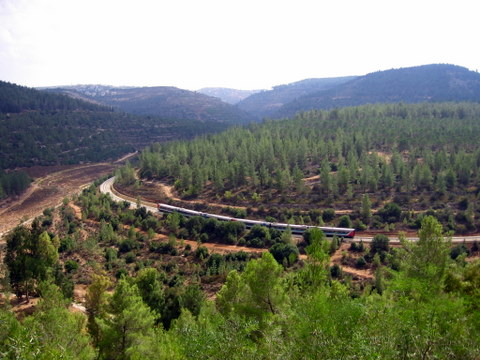
Jerusalem train

Israel Railways operates two separate train lines to Jerusalem. The main line is the new high-speed rail link, which opened in 2018, with an expected transit time from Tel Aviv of about 30 minutes. It runs from Tel Aviv to Jerusalem via Ben Gurion Airport and terminates at a new underground station, Jerusalem–Yitzhak Navon railway station, located between the Jerusalem Central Bus Station and the International Convention Center.

The older line goes from Bet Shemesh to Southern Jerusalem with 2 stops: Jerusalem Malha near the Malha Mall and Jerusalem Biblical Zoo. This line was originally part of the Jaffa–Jerusalem railway, which opened in 1892. It was out of use for seven years because of deteriorating conditions and was restored on April 9, 2005. Jerusalem Malha is a new station which replaces the historical Khan Station at Remez Square near the Old City.

== Light rail ==
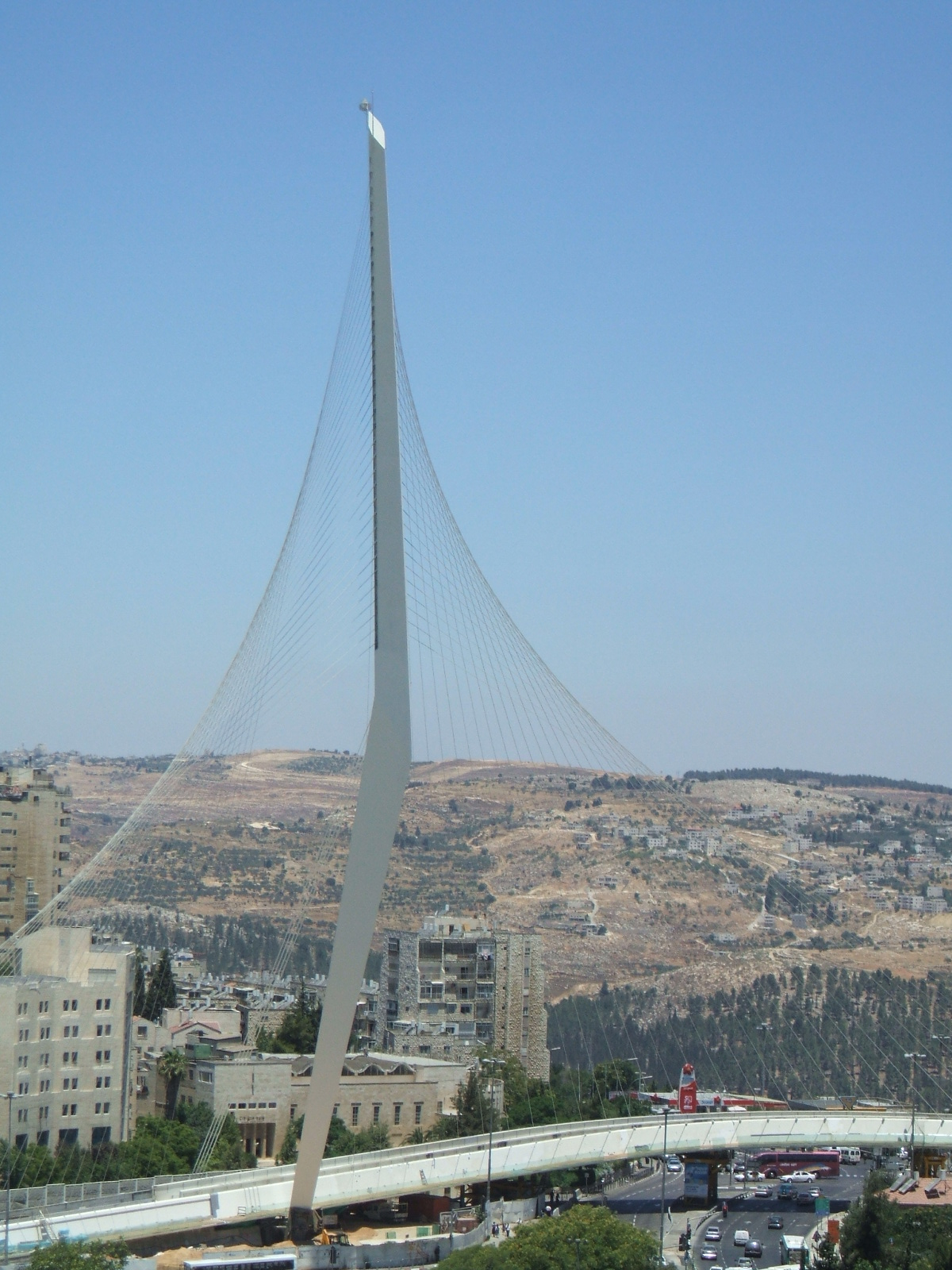
Jerusalem Chords Bridge

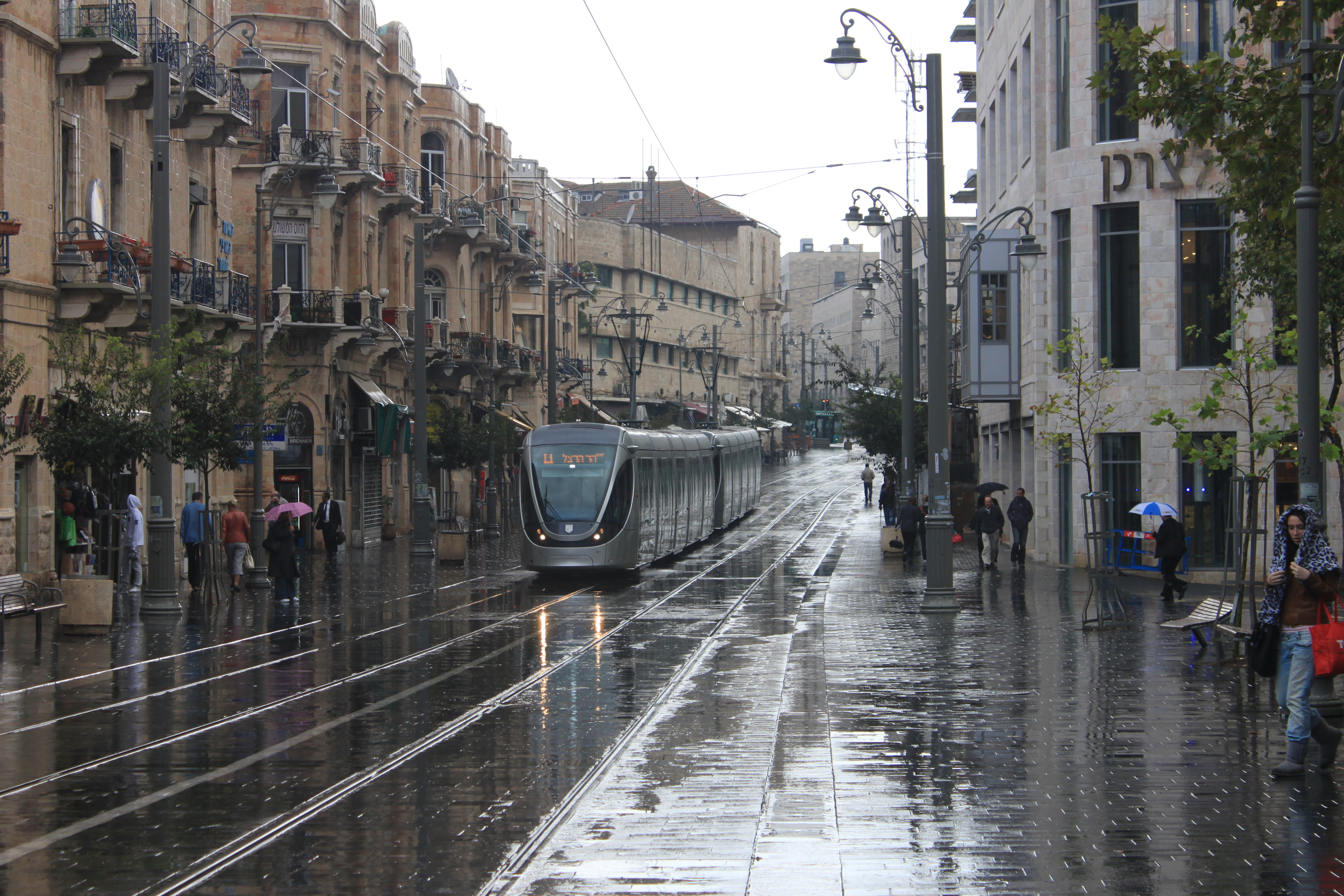
Light Rail tram on Jaffa Road

The first line of the Jerusalem Light Rail network was completed in 2010 with the erection of Santiago Calatrava's Chords Bridge over Jaffa Road. The first line began operating from Pisgat Ze'ev in the northeast, through French Hill and Jaffa Road to the Central Bus Station and the southwestern neighborhoods. The line was fully operational by late 2011, after several delays, with 14 trains and a maximum headway of 12 minutes. Extensions of the line are expected to open in 2025 after significant delays to Hadassa Ein Kerem Hospital in the west and to the Neve Yaakov neighborhood in the north. Additional lines have been planned from the southern neighborhood of Gilo to the Hebrew University Mount Scopus Campus via Givat Ram and the entrance to the city (Green Line) and from Gilo to Mount Hotzvim via the City Center and Meah Shearim (Blue Line).

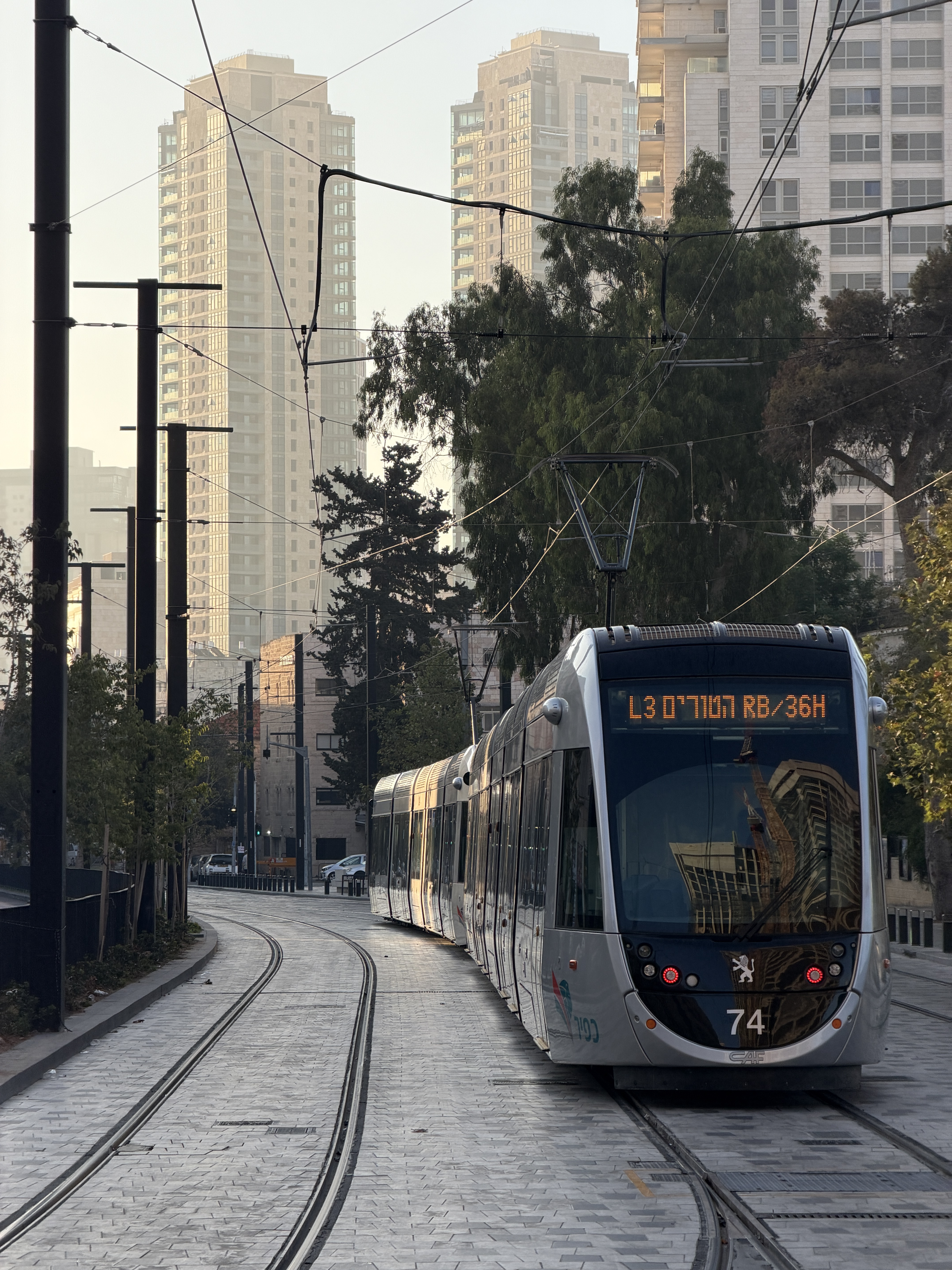
L3 line of Jerusalem light rail near Haturim station in the early morning of August 21, 2026

== Airports ==
Atarot Airport was Jerusalem's airport, but was closed to civilian traffic in 2000 due to security concerns arising from the Second Intifada, and was later placed under IDF control during 2001. However, Ben Gurion International Airport, 40 km (24 mi) northwest of the city, serves as the primary international air transport hub for both Jerusalem and Tel Aviv. As the largest of the nation's three international airports (the others are in Haifa and Eilat, but Haifa Airport is unable to handle the largest aircraft), Ben Gurion is Israel's busiest airport, serving over 20 million passengers annually.
