= Andrei Tverdokhlebov =

Soviet physicist (1940–2011)

Andrei Nikolayevich Tverdokhlebov
- Андрей Николаевич Твердохлебов
- Born: September 30, 1940; Moscow, Russia
- Died: December 3, 2011 (aged 71); Pennsylvania, United States
- Education: Moscow Institute of Physics and Technology, Drexel University (Ph.D.)
- Occupation: physicist
- Known for: human rights activism with participation in the Committee on Human Rights in the USSR
- Movement: dissident movement in the Soviet Union
- Spouse: Natalia Tverdokhlebova
- Children: daughter Maria Fyodorova

Andrei Nikolayevich Tverdokhlebov (Russian: Андре́й Никола́евич Твердохле́бов, 30 September 1940, Moscow – 3 December 2011, Pennsylvania, United States) was a Soviet physicist, dissident and human rights activist. In 1970, he founded - along with Valery Chalidze and Andrei Sakharov - the Committee on Human Rights in the USSR. In 1973, Tverdokhlebov - along with Valentin Turchin - founded the first chapter of Amnesty International in the Soviet Union. He also helped found Group 73, a human rights organization that helped political prisoners in the Soviet Union. He was the author/editor of several samizdat publications while in the Soviet Union, which were compiled in the book, "In Defense of Human Rights", published by Khronika Press, New York, in 1975.

== Biography ==
Andrei Tverdokhlebov was born in 1940 in Moscow into a high-ranking Communist government family. His father, Nikolai Tverdokhlebov, was the Soviet Deputy Minister of Culture in the 1950s and, later, the cultural attache to the Soviet embassy in the Federal Republic of Germany.

Tverdokhlebov graduated from the Moscow Institute of Physics and Technology, and did post-graduate work at the Dubna Institute of Nuclear Research, focusing on theoretical physics.

In 1980, he emigrated to the United States. He appeared at a hearing before a U.S. House of Representatives subcommittee to discuss the role of Soviet scientists in the Soviet human rights movement, but, for the most part, ceased his human rights activities while in the U.S. However, he actively continued his scientific research - first at Lehigh University, then at Drexel University where he received a Ph.D. in 1989 with the thesis, "A New Approach to Bulk Wave Propagation in Anisotropic Media."

== Human Rights Activism ==
In November 1970, Tverdokhlebov, along with Andrei Sakharov and Valery Chalidze announced the formation of the Committee on Human Rights in the USSR. According to Sakharov's memoirs, the international publicity of the formation of this group surpassed any of their expectations. "For the next week, a good half of all broadcasts over the Voice of America, the BBC, and Deutsche Welle were about the Committee, stressing its significance as an independent association that would study human rights objectively and then publish its findings."

In February 1971, Tverdokhlebov and his associate, Chalidze, were summoned to the Moscow Procurator's Office and told that "the existence of their committee was an infringement of the law, and that by carrying on their activities, they were laying themselves open to criminal prosecution."

In 1973, Tverdokhlebov and Valentin Turchin founded the first chapter of Amnesty International in the Soviet Union. Tverdokhlebov served as the chapter's Secretary.

On 27 November 1974, Tverdokhlebov was accosted on the streets of Moscow by KGB agents, while walking home with a friend from a movie, and escorted back to his apartment where the agents proceeded to search through his belongings. During the search, several items were confiscated: three issues of the Chronicle of the Lithuanian Catholic Church; a copy of The Gulag Archipelago; three issues of A Chronicle of Human Rights [New York]; an issue of the Bulletin of the Council of Relatives of Evangelical-Christian Baptist Prisoners; documents in defense of civil rights; lists of addresses of political prisoners and their families; lists of addresses of German families wishing to emigrate to the Federal Republic of Germany (about 2,000 families); materials about the situation in labor camps and prisons; notebooks; a typewriter; and a tape recorder. On 28 November 1974, Tverdokhlebov issued a "Statement on the Search of 27/28 November'", which ended with the sentence: "However, they have not yet taken away my fountain pen." This would be one of several searches of his apartment.

On 18 April 1975, Tverdokhlebov was arrested and taken to Lefortovo Prison to await his trial.

In 1975, ten Jewish scholars spoke out strongly in defense of Tverdokhlebov. "In a sharply worded appeal which has just reached the West they call on 'all people of good will' to demand Dr. Tverdokhlebov’s 'immediate release.' The appeal is notable, as Soviet Jews do not normally intercede for non-Jews, and Tverdokhlebov is a Russian. The only exceptions in the past have been the world-famous figures of Andrei Sakharov and Alexander Solzhenitsyn."

In April 1976, the Moscow Municipal Court sentenced Tverdokhlebov to five years in exile for "dissemination of fabrications, known to be false, which discredit the Soviet State and social system". He was exiled to a small village of Nyurbachan in Yakutia, in Siberia. According to a New Scientist article from 1976, the village only had a few hundred inhabitants and was cut off from normal transport for eight months of the year due to extreme weather conditions. In October 1976, Andrei Sakharov and his wife traveled from Moscow to visit Tverdokhlebov in exile - a precarious journey, which Sakharov outlined in his memoirs.

He is survived by his wife, Natalia Tverdokhlebova, and his step-daughter, Maria Fyodorova, both of Washington, D.C.

== Publications ==
- Sakharov, Andrei; Tverdokhlebov, Andrei; Albrecht, Vladimir (28 May 1974). "USSR. The chronicle of current events". Index on Censorship. 3 (3): 87. doi:10.1080/03064227408532355. S2CID 220923855.
- Tverdokhlebov, Andrei (September 1975). "Two searches & four interrogations". Index on Censorship. 4 (3): 56–67. doi:10.1080/03064227508532451. S2CID 143607731.
