= Valery Chalidze =

Soviet-Georgian human rights activist

- Валерий Николаевич Чалидзе
- Born: Valery Nikolaevich Chalidze; 25 November 1938; Moscow, USSR
- Died: 3 January 2018 (aged 79); United States
- Citizenship: USSR; USA from 1979
- Education: Moscow State University, Tbilisi State University
- Known for: Founding legalist branch of human rights movement in USSR; developing concept of mass and electric charge in vortex theory of matter.
- Scientific career
- Fields: physics, human rights

Valery Nikolaevich Chalidze (Russian: Вале́рий Никола́евич Чали́дзе; Georgian: ვალერი ჭალიძე: 25 November 1938 – 3 January 2018) was a Soviet author, publisher, dissident, and human rights activist. He was deprived of his USSR citizenship in 1972 while on a visit to the US.

His Georgian father was killed during World War Two. His mother, Francheska Jansen, was an architect and designer, descended from Poles exiled to Siberia for their opposition to the Tsarist regime. Chalidze himself challenged the Soviet regime by mastering Soviet law, then demanding that the dictatorship comply with its own laws. This strategy may have afforded Chalidze some protection from the prosecution faced by other dissidents. According to fellow dissident Pavel Litvinov, ""There were rumors that he could be killed, but it was very difficult to arrest him and put him in prison."

Chalidze was born in Moscow and educated as a physicist at the universities of Moscow and Tbilisi in Georgia. In the 1960s he joined the nascent Soviet human rights movement: he began publishing Social Issues in 1969, and helped to found the Committee for Human Rights the following year. In 1972 Chalidze was deprived of his Soviet citizenship and spent the rest of his life in the United States.

== Social Issues ==
In August 1969 the underground periodical Social Issues (Obshchestvennye problemy) made its first appearance. Set up and edited by Chalidze, it covered a range of themes in the humanities and social sciences, including both original articles and translated work. It had a constant focus on the application of law, in the Soviet Union and elsewhere, and the defense of human rights. As part of his publishing activities Chalidze became adept at mending mechanical typewriters, the essential tool of samizdat publication and distribution.

Under his guiding hand, Social Issues constantly opened new horizons for discussion. For example, he contributed to discussion of the definition, under Soviet conditions, of the term political prisoner and its practical application. The periodical championed the right of all Soviet citizens to emigrate to another country of their choosing and, in particular, he upheld the right of Jews to leave the USSR.

Chalidze wielded Soviet law in defense of many different people, including Crimean Tatars, students, Jews, Orthodox Christians, political prisoners, Baptists, and Muslims. He went further than many dissidents in calling openly for the repeal of the Stalin-era law criminalizing homosexual relations between adult males. It was a stance that concerned some of his colleagues, and led to an attempt by the Soviet regime to discredit him among the wider population by suggesting (wrongly) that he was himself gay—an assertion that could have paved the way for criminal prosecution of him.

== The Moscow Human Rights Committee ==
On 4 November 1970, together with Andrei Sakharov and Andrei Tverdokhlebov, Chalidze founded the Moscow Human Rights Committee. The following month Newsweek, the US weekly magazine, published Chalidze's replies to questions from its Moscow correspondent about the Committee's aims and the prospects for its future activities.

The Committee was among the first non-governmental organizations in the post-Stalin history of the Soviet Union (cf. "Action Group for the Defense of Human Rights in the USSR", set up in May 1969), and eventually became affiliated with the United Nations. Its purpose was to offer free legal advice to persons whose human rights had been violated by the Soviet authorities, and also to advise those authorities on their legal obligations in regard to human rights under international and Soviet law.

Chalidze was an innovative strategist of the Soviet human-rights movement, who described himself as an "evolutionary" rather than a revolutionary. After educating himself on Soviet and international law as they pertained to human rights, Chalidze invited the Soviet dictatorship into a dialogue on human rights issues, utilizing the Committee both to offer free legal advice to those whose rights had been violated, and to the Soviet government itself. In addition to demanding that the authorities comply with the law, Chalidze also adhered to the position that the dissidents, too, must obey the law. He would later summarize this position by writing: "One must have clean hands to do good deeds."

== Life and activities in USA ==
In 1972, Chalidze was invited by the well-known American lawyer Samuel Dash to deliver a lecture on human rights at Georgetown University in Washington, D.C. Once there, the Presidium of the Supreme Soviet of the USSR issued a decree depriving him of his Soviet citizenship, and prevented him from returning to the Soviet Union. His wife Vera Slonim, a cousin of Pavel Litvinov, remained with him in the United States for a short time, retaining her Soviet citizenship. She then moved to England, and the two were divorced.

=== Publication renewed ===
In partnership with US businessman Ed Kline Chalidze soon established Khronika Press. Based in New York, its purpose was to publish Russian-language books and important Soviet periodicals as the Chronicle of Current Events (April 1968-July 1982).

Together with Pavel Litvinov and Peter Reddaway, he also began to edit and publish the bimonthly, A Chronicle of Human Rights in the USSR (1973-1982), that drew on the contents of the Moscow-based Chronicle, but included original materials by Chalidze and others.

In 1979, he founded Chalidze Publications, a second New York-based publishing house. It focused primarily on culturally important, non-fiction works in Russian that for reasons of censorship were unavailable to Soviet readers. Among the books issued by Chalidze Publications were original memoirs of historically important figures (such as Nikita Khrushchev), memoirs of Soviet dissidents whose work was banned in their home country, Russian translations of classic Western works of political philosophy, and original analyses of social problems.

Chalidze continued to work as a physicist, meanwhile, and for several years was a visiting scholar in the physics department at Columbia University (New York).

In 1979 Chalidze became a citizen of the United States, after having been stateless since 13 December 1972. He was retained by the U.S. Department of State to assess Soviet violations of international human-rights covenants. His report issued in 1980, and identified with specificity and legal precision many such violations.

=== Move to Vermont ===
In 1980 Chalidze met Lisa Leah Barnhardt on a visit to Oregon. They were married shortly thereafter. Upon her completion of law school in New York, they moved to Benson, Vermont, in 1983, which became the new home of Chalidze Publications and Khronika Press. Chalidze resided in Benson until his death on 3 January 2018, when he died unexpectedly at his home.

In Vermont, Chalidze continued to publish several journals and edited others such as Internal Contradictions (Vnutrennie protivorechiya). For a number of years he was a visiting scholar in the history department at Middlebury College (Middlebury, Vermont).

In total, Chalidze Publications published almost one hundred books in Russian and in English, including the Kama Sutra, translated at Chalidze's request by Vladimir Kozlosvsky.

Chalidze never stopped working in physics, and in 2001 published his "Mass and Electric Charge in the Vortex Theory of Matter."

== Trotsky, Stalin, Hamilton and Madison ==
Among the works issued by Chalidze Publications were hitherto unpublished material retrieved from the Trotsky archive at Harvard University, as well as the memoirs of Trotsky, and Chalidze's own works about the Trotskyite opposition of the 1920s and 1930s and the post-Stalin dissident movement in the USSR.

In his Conqueror of Communism (New York, 1981), Chalidze depicted Joseph Stalin as a counter-revolutionary leader who destroyed socialism in Russia. Stalin "restored the Russian empire although in a more despotic form", he contended, using Marxist ideology to mask his real aims.

With the rise of Mikhail Gorbachev as Soviet leader, Chalidze continued to participate in the effort to promote democracy in his native country. Among other works, he wrote "Russian Nationalism and Perestroika," which was published by The American Jewish Committee in 1990. From 1985 to 1990 Chalidze received a MacArthur Fellowship in recognition of his work in international human rights.

At the request of the U.S. Administration, Chalidze Publications also organized and published the first-ever Russian translation of The Federalist Papers (1788). It would be an official presidential gift from George H. W. Bush to Gorbachev at one of their three summit meetings in 1990. Chalidze established a translation team for the purpose. He himself served as Editor-in-Chief, and his wife Lisa Barnhardt Chalidze, an American attorney, was Legal Editor. The primary translator was Gregory Freidin of Stanford, who was advised by Leon Lipson of Yale Law School. Gorbachev and Yeltsin both quoted from The American Federalists in their historic debates in the Russian parliament after August 1991 during the final months of the Soviet Union.

== Citizenship and Death ==
During perestroika the Soviet regime of Mikhail Gorbachev offered to restore Chalidze's USSR citizenship. He rebuffed the offer. "You had no right to take it away," he said, "and you certainly have no right to give it back."

Chalidze never returned to the Soviet Union (or the Russian Federation after 1992); he did not see his mother again. His sister Francheska, sacked from her job as a scientist in retribution for her brother's dissident activities, emigrated to the US and settled in San Diego.

== Works ==
=== Human Rights and History ===
Periodicals (editor and author)

- 1969-1972 - Social Issues, Moscow: Samizdat, Nos 1-12 (in Russian).
- 1973-1982 - A Chronicle of Human Rights in the USSR, New York: Khronika Press, Nos 1-54 (in Russian and English).

Books and Articles (author)

in English

- 1971 - Important aspects of human rights in the Soviet Union; a report to the Human Rights Committee. New York: American Jewish Committee. OCLC 317422393.
- 1973 - "The right of a convicted citizen to leave his country". Harvard Civil Rights-Civil Liberties Law Review. 8 (1): 1–13. January 1973.
- 1975 - In defense of Andrei Tverdokhlebov. New York: Khronika Press. 1975., 16 pp.
- 1975 - To defend these rights: human rights and the Soviet Union. New York: Random House. 1975. ISBN 0394487257.
- 1977 - Criminal Russia: essays on crime in the Soviet Union. New York: Random House. 1977. ISBN 0394405986.
- 1977 - "How important is Soviet dissent?". Commentary. 63 (6): 57. 1 June 1977.
- 1980 - The observance of the UN covenant on civil and political rights by the Soviet Union. Institute on Socialist Law. ASIN B0006XTRQ4.
- 1980 - Chalidze, Valery (1980). "The humanitarian provisions of the Helsinki Accord: a critique of their significance". Vanderbilt Journal of Transnational Law. 13 (13): 429–450.
- 1981 - The Conqueror of Communism, Stalin and Socialism, New York: Chalidze Publications.
- 1984 - The Soviet human rights movement: a memoir. New York: Jacob Blaustein Institute for the Advancement of Human Rights, American Jewish Committee. 1984. ISBN 0874950643.
- 1989 - Chalidze, Valery (November 1989). "Perestroika, socialism, and the Constitution". The Annals of the American Academy of Political and Social Science. 506 (1): 98–108. doi:10.1177/0002716289506001009. S2CID 144923308.
- 2000 - Entropy Demystified: Potential Order, Life and Money
- 2001 - Mass And Electric Charge In The Vortex Theory Of Matter

in Russian

- 1976 - The literary cases of the KGB: the cases of Superfin, Etkind, Heifetz and Maramzin, Khronika press: New York. The appendix contains documents about Soviet censorship.
- 1988 - Nationality problems and perestroika (Natsional'nye problemy i perestrojka), Benson, VT: Chalidze Publications.

Co-author

- 1977 - with Lipson, Leon (1977). Papers on Soviet law. Institute on Socialist Law.
- 1984 - "In defense of Anatoly Marchenko", Kontinent No 152, Paris. With Ludmila Alexeyeva, Pyotr Grigorenko, Andrei Amalrik, Dina Kaminskaya, Konstantin Simes, Nikolai Williams, Pavel Litvinov, Maya Litvinova, Natalya Sadomskaya and Boris Stain (in Russian).
- 1985 - with Alexeyeva, Ludmilla. Mass rioting in the USSR. Silver Spring: Foundation for Soviet Studies.
- 1990 - with Lisa Chalidze, The Dawn of Legal Reform, 1985-1989, Benson, VT: Chalidze Publications.

=== Natural Sciences ===
- 1974 - Chalidze, V. (5 April 1974). "Appeal for Mars data". Science. 184 (4132): 9. Bibcode:1974Sci...184Q...9C. doi:10.1126/science.184.4132.9. PMID 17734618.
- 1985 - On the linguistic brain code, Benson, VT: Chalidze Publications.
- 1986 - Brain code and paleolinguistics, Benson, VT: Chalidze Publications.
- 1992 - with Lisa Chalidze
