= Sakharov Gardens =

Sakharov Gardens גינות סחרוב
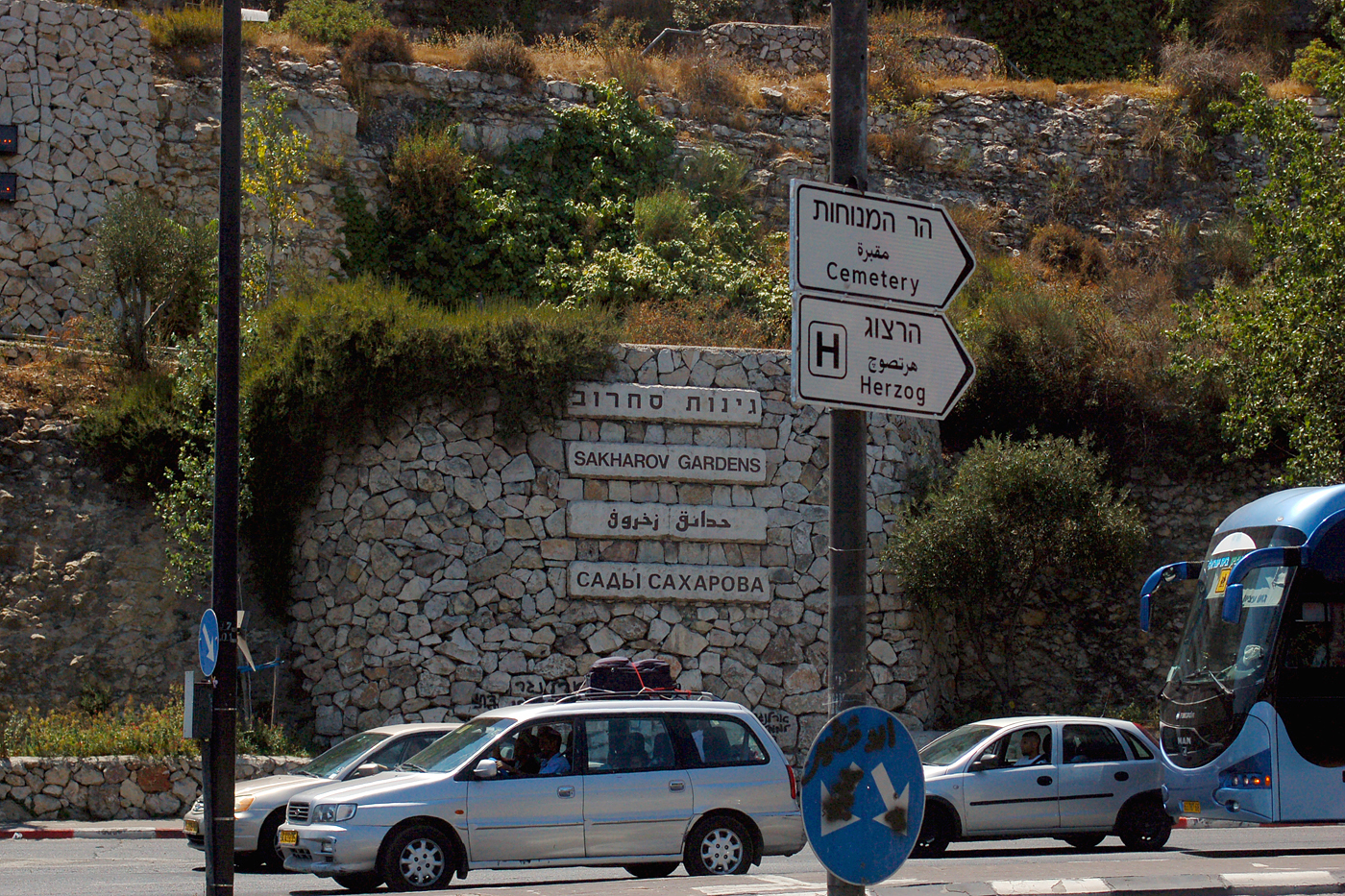
- The road junction in 2011
- Interactive map of Sakharov Gardens גינות סחרוב

Location
- West Jerusalem, Israel
- Coordinates: 31°47′42.97″N 35°11′17.67″E
- Roads at junction: Route 333

Construction
- Type: Intersection

Sakharov Gardens (Hebrew: גינות סחרוב, Ginot Sakharov) is a busy intersection on the highway from Tel Aviv to Jerusalem, located close to the main entry point to Jerusalem from the West. It is named after the Soviet physicist and human rights activist Andrei Sakharov.

Due to the frequent traffic congestion at the intersection, a project to upgrade it started in 2019. It was reopened as an interchange in 2021.
