= East Jerusalem Central Bus Station =

Bus station in East Jerusalem, Palestine

Coordinates: 31.782922°N 35.231465°E

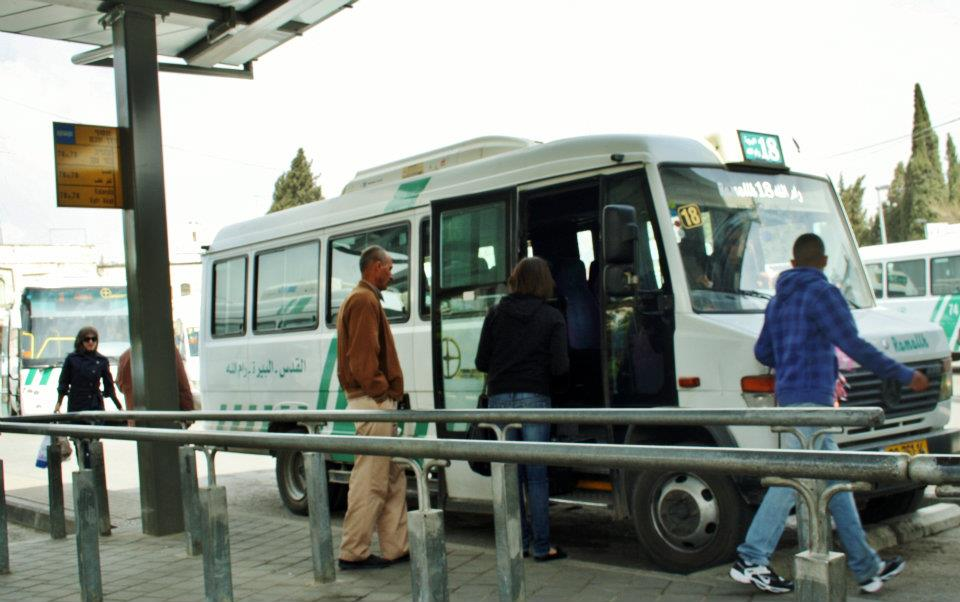
Bus 18 to Ramallah

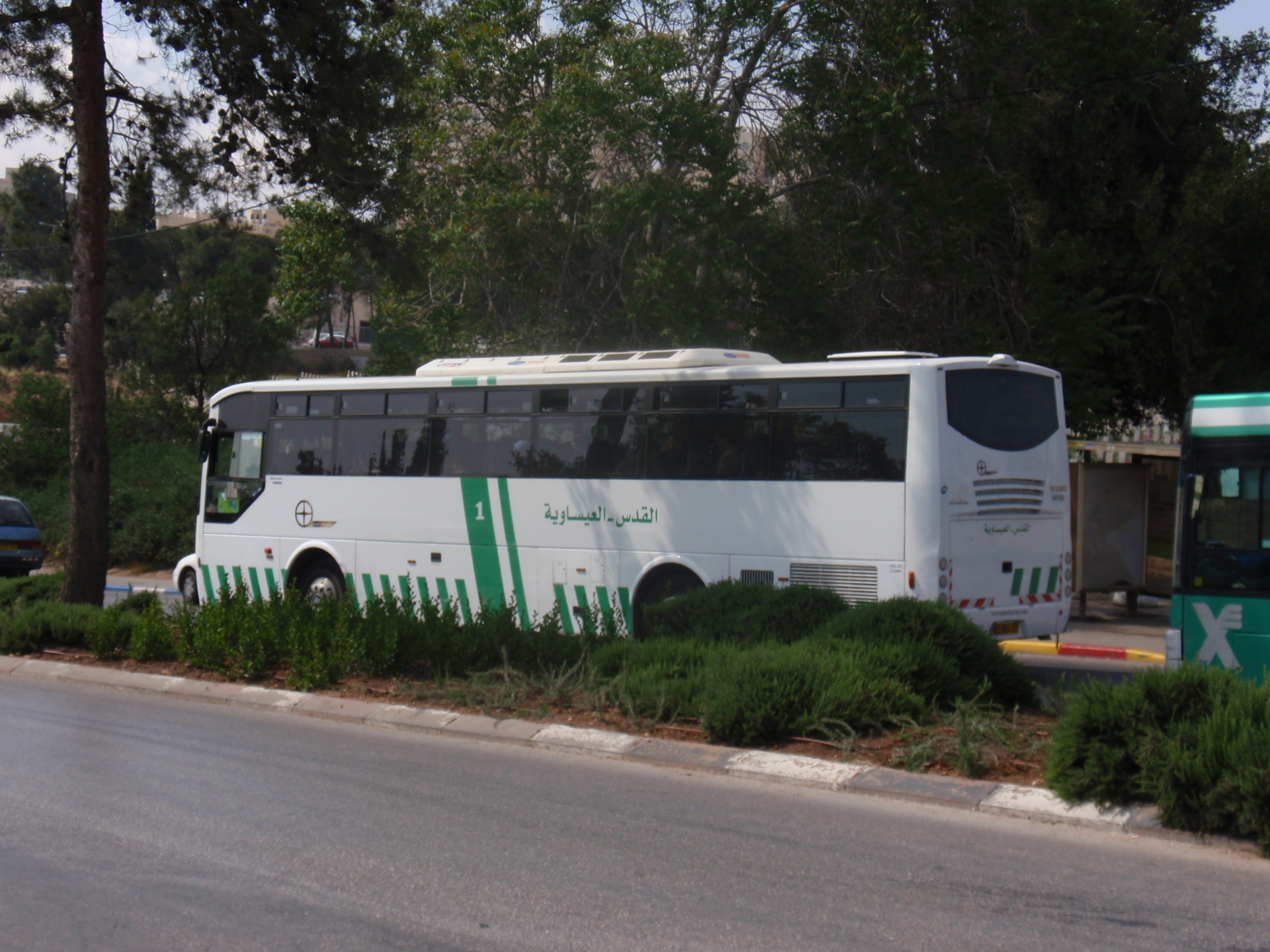
Bus used by Arab neighborhoods in East Jerusalem

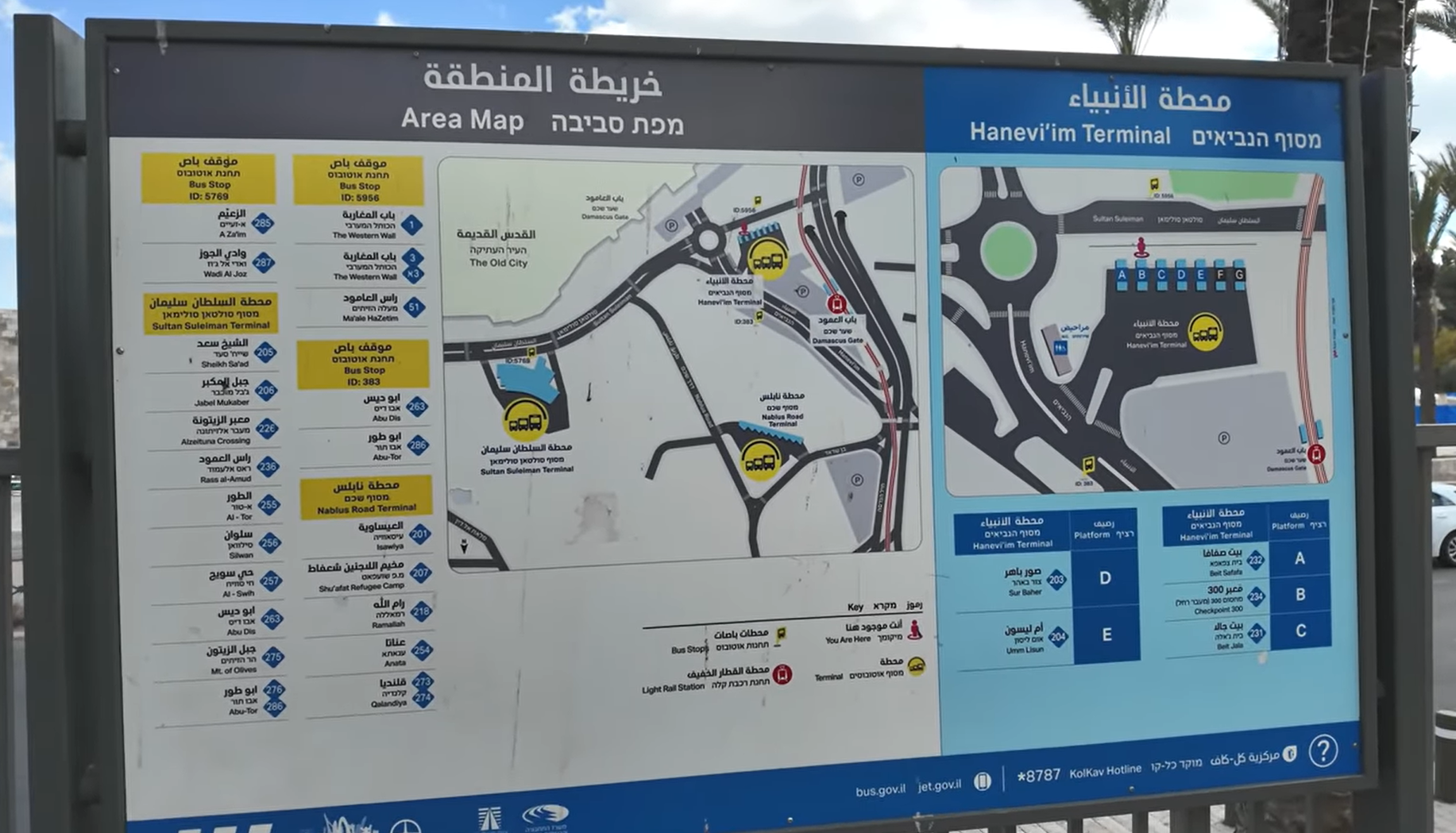
Map of East Jerusalem bus terminals

The East Jerusalem Central Bus Station is a transportation hub serving Arab neighborhoods in the city of Jerusalem and other locations in the West Bank. It is located on Sultan Suleiman Street across from the Old City's Damascus Gate, as well as the Damascus Gate light rail station for Jerusalem's Red Line.

== History ==
Starting in the 1920s, the Damascus Gate plaza area became a transportation hub as it developed into a commercial center for the city’s Arab residents. Initially, horse carts and taxis gathered there, and eventually, bus services to nearby cities like Bethlehem, Jericho, and Ramallah began operating from the plaza.

Established in 1953, the station was leased to the Jerusalem municipality for thirty years. It is owned and operated by the Waqf administration responsible for a number of properties in the Old City.

The Garden Tomb terminal, constructed by the Jerusalem Municipality, began operations in June 1976. It features 14 platforms, along with office rooms and restrooms. Bus services to Shu’fat, Ramallah, Al Bireh, and Nablus were relocated to this station. Meanwhile, the old bus station on Sultan Suleiman Jericho Street continues to serve buses heading to Bethlehem and Hebron. Additionally, an official parking lot was established at the end of HaNeviim Street, opposite Damascus Gate, to accommodate dozens of taxis operating in the area.

In April 1984, members of the Jewish underground planned to blow up five buses parked in the Sultan Suleiman supplement but were seized by the Shin Bet near the planting of the explosives.

As congestion at the station increased, the Jerusalem Municipality proposed a plan in 1986 to construct a new station on the lot between Damascus Gate and the Musrara neighborhood. This area had been a no man’s land for the municipal line between 1948 and 1967. The plan also included extending Bar-Lev Boulevard (“Highway 1”) into part of the area. However, the proposal faced numerous objections from residents and environmentalists.

In 1999, an alternative plan was approved for the construction of an additional terminal on Nablus Road. The terminal, built by the East Jerusalem Development Company at a cost of NIS 18 million, was inaugurated in July 2003.

By the end of the 1990s, shared taxi lines to Tel Aviv began operating from the Damascus Gate plaza on weekends. These services were primarily used by the community of foreign workers in East Jerusalem, who visited the holy sites in the Old City.

== See also ==
- Jerusalem Central Bus Station
- Jerusalem Light Rail
- Old City of Jerusalem
