= Emeq HaArazim =

Coordinates: 31.8002°N 35.1713°E

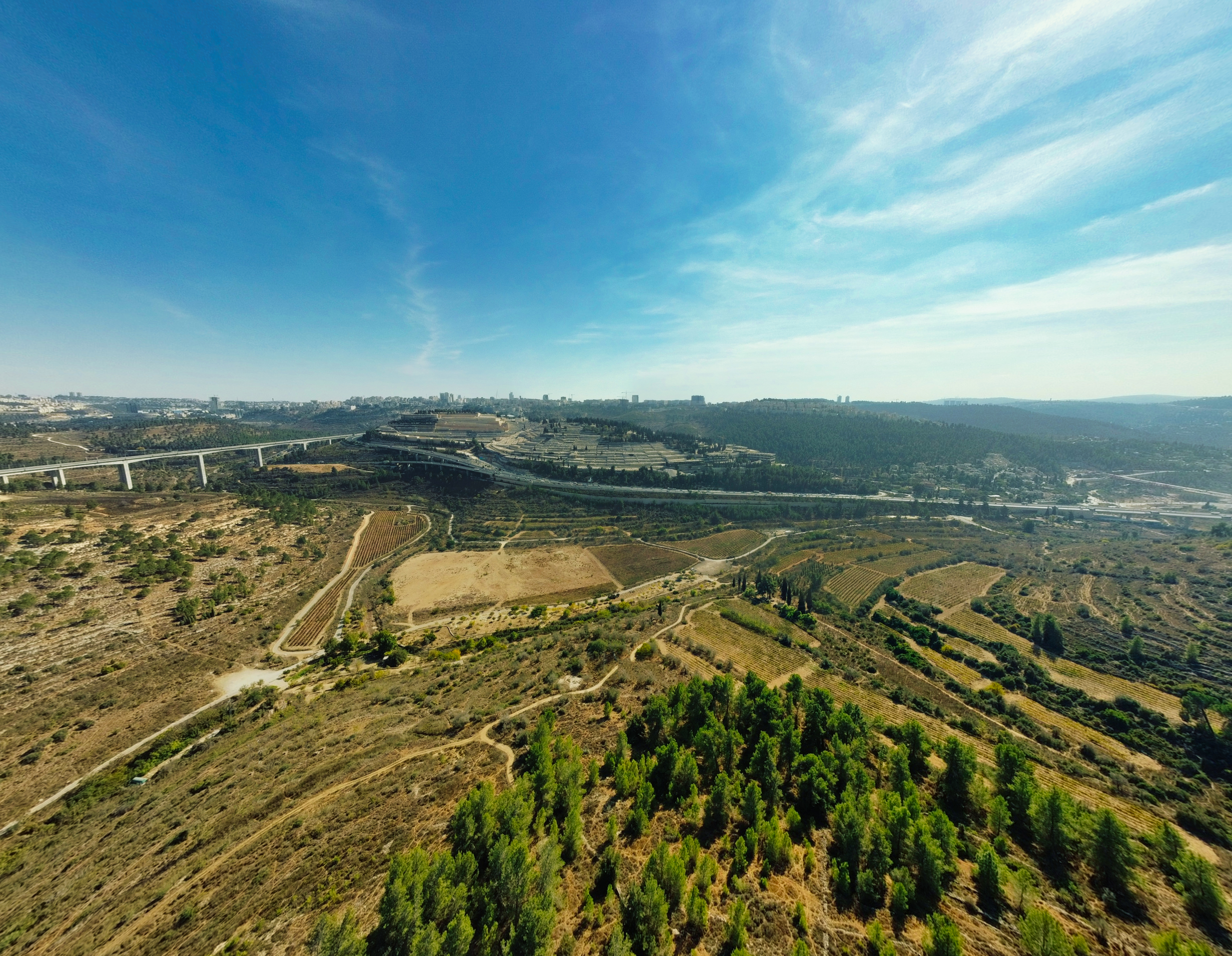

Emeq HaArazim (Hebrew: עמק הארזים) is a valley in the Judean Mountains of Israel.

It is located on the northwestern edge of Jerusalem in the Judean Mountains, at an altitude of over 550 meters. It takes the form of a small depression, which is crossed by the Wadi Sorek, into which Nahal Luz flows from the north and Nahal Halilim from the west. Numerous springs spring up here, especially Einot Telem. The bottom of the valley has the original character of a rural landscape, but along the southern edge of the depression passes the body of Highway 1. In the southeast rises the hill Har HaMenuchot with a large cemetery area. To the west stands the town of Mevaseret Zion on the hills above the valley. Not far from the northern edge of the valley runs the Green Line separating the West Bank and the Palestinian village of Beit Iksa.

In the second decade of the 21st century, the Tel Aviv–Jerusalem railway, a high-speed railway line, was built across the valley with a bridge over the Emeq HaArazim, which holds a national altitude record (almost 100 meters).

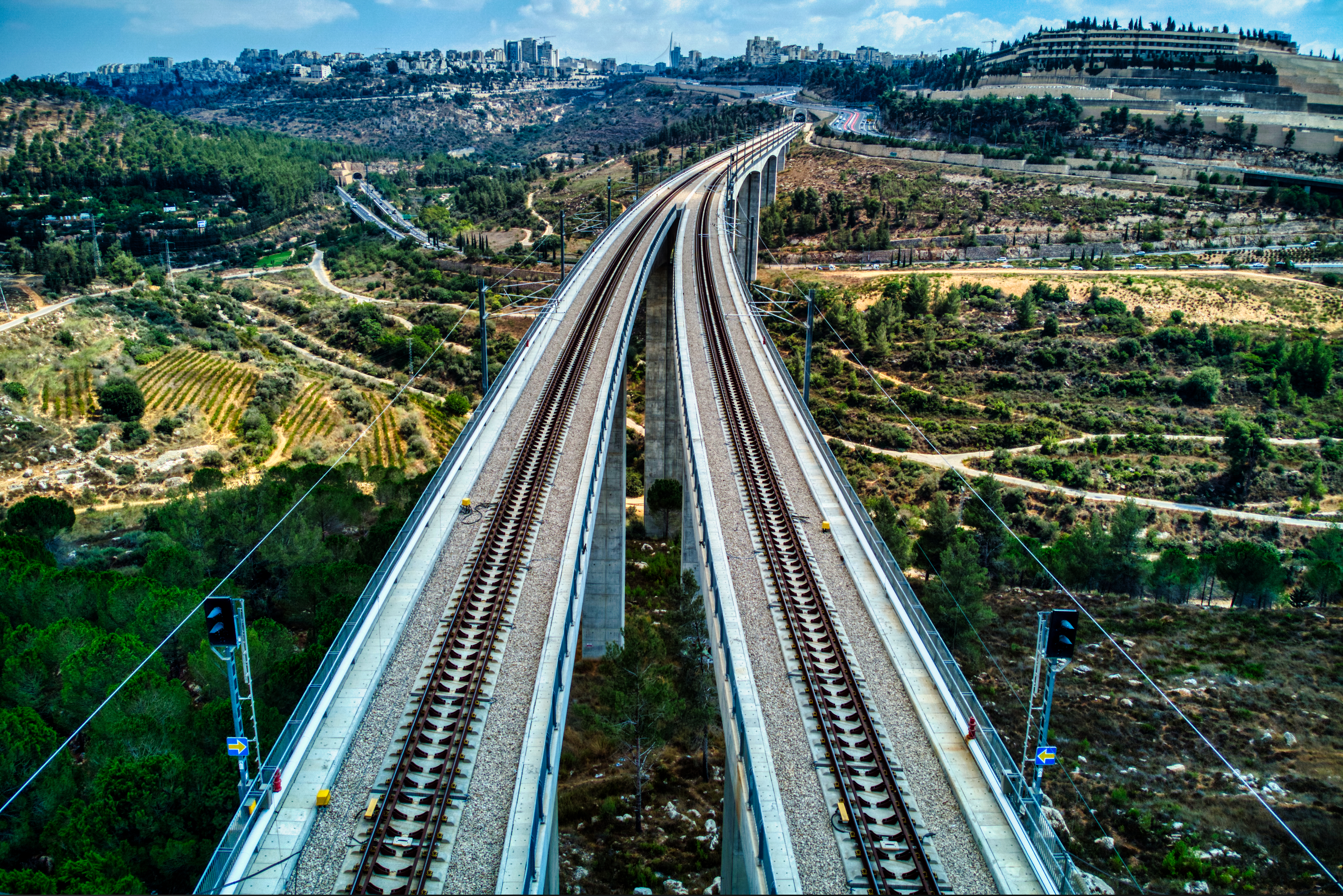
Tel Aviv-Jerusalem New Railroad - Bridge no. 10, Arazim Train Bridge

== See also ==
- Geography of Israel
