= Zoltan Harmat =

Hungarian-Israeli architect

Zoltan Harmat זולטאן הרמט
- Born: August 20, 1900; Máramarossziget, Hungary (today Sighet, Romania)
- Died: June 1, 1985 (aged 84); Israel
- Education: University of Budapest
- Occupation: Architect
- Relatives: Dumitru Cernicica brother in law
- Projects: Holyland residential complex, Villa Hanna Salameh (The Salameh House)

Zoltan "Shimshon" Harmat, born Stern (Hebrew: זולטאן "שימשון" הרמט; August 20, 1900, in Máramarossziget, Hungary - June 1, 1985, in Israel) was an Israeli architect.

== Biography ==
Zoltan Harmat was born in the town of Máramarossziget, Hungary (today Sighet in Romania). Harmat's parents provided him with a rich education and cultural experience. His father served as a teacher and director of a local Jewish school.

At the end of high school, Harmat decided to study architecture at the Budapest Faculty of Architecture and completed his degree in 1924.

After graduation Harmat worked for one year in his profession, before immigrating to Mandate Palestine. In the following years he went back several times to visit his relatives, the last time just days before the outbreak of the Second World War, Harmat making it back to Palestine on the last ship to cross in peacetime. After the war there was no one left of his family in Sighet, all having been killed in the Auschwitz extermination camp.

In Palestine Harmat joined a firm led by the renowned British architect Albert Clifford Holliday and worked there for the next five years. During this period, he participated in the planning of many projects in Jerusalem, including St Andrew's Church (the "Scottish Church"; 1927), the Town Hall on Jaffa Street 22 (1930), the Bible Society House on 7 Yohanan MeGush Halav (John of Giscala) Street (1926–28), and two new wings for the outpatient Saint John Eye Hospital, separated by the Hebron Road - one wing is currently the Mt Zion Hotel, and the other the Jerusalem House of Quality.

After the departure of Holliday, Harmat contributed in one way or another to other important projects, such as the Central Post Office, the National Bank and the Generali Building. Around the 1930s and 1940s, he designed, independently, homes for elite families in Jerusalem.

One of his most famous designs is the Holyland Hotel near the Malha neighbourhood. The hotel was planned in 1952, built between 1955-1958, and demolished to make place for new hotels and private homes in the 2000s. Harmat designed the hotel implementing a modern International Style type of architecture and utilising Jerusalem's traditional white limestone.

== Selected projects ==
Zoltan Harmat designed over 150 architectural projects. All projects are built in Jerusalem unless stated otherwise.

- Designed by Albert Clifford Holliday's architecture firm, with Harmat's contribution:
  - British and Foreign Bible Society Building (1926–28), 7 Yohanan MeGush Halav Street, now 8 Safra Square, currently housing municipality offices.
  - St. Andrew's Scottish Church (the late 20s)
  - Town Hall and Barclays Bank, 22 Jaffa Road (1930)
  - St John Ophthalmic Hospital: renovation of old wing and design of new wing (opened in 1930; since the 1960s it houses the Jerusalem House of Quality)
- Harmat's own projects:
  - The home of Hanania, a contractor, 32 Keren Hayesod Street (1931)
  - The home of Shalom Horowitz , an attorney, 20 Ahad Ha'am Street, Talbiyeh (1931)
  - The home of Braude, an accountant, 22 Ahad Ha'am Street, Talbiyeh (1931)
  - The home of Hanna Salameh, a merchant, 2 Balfour Street, Talbiyeh (1932)
  - 21 Balfour Street, Talbiyeh
  - The home of Oved Ben-Ami, the first mayor of Netanya, inspired by the works of Erich Mendelsohn, originally built in Netanya (1935-1937) but now no longer standing

== Gallery ==
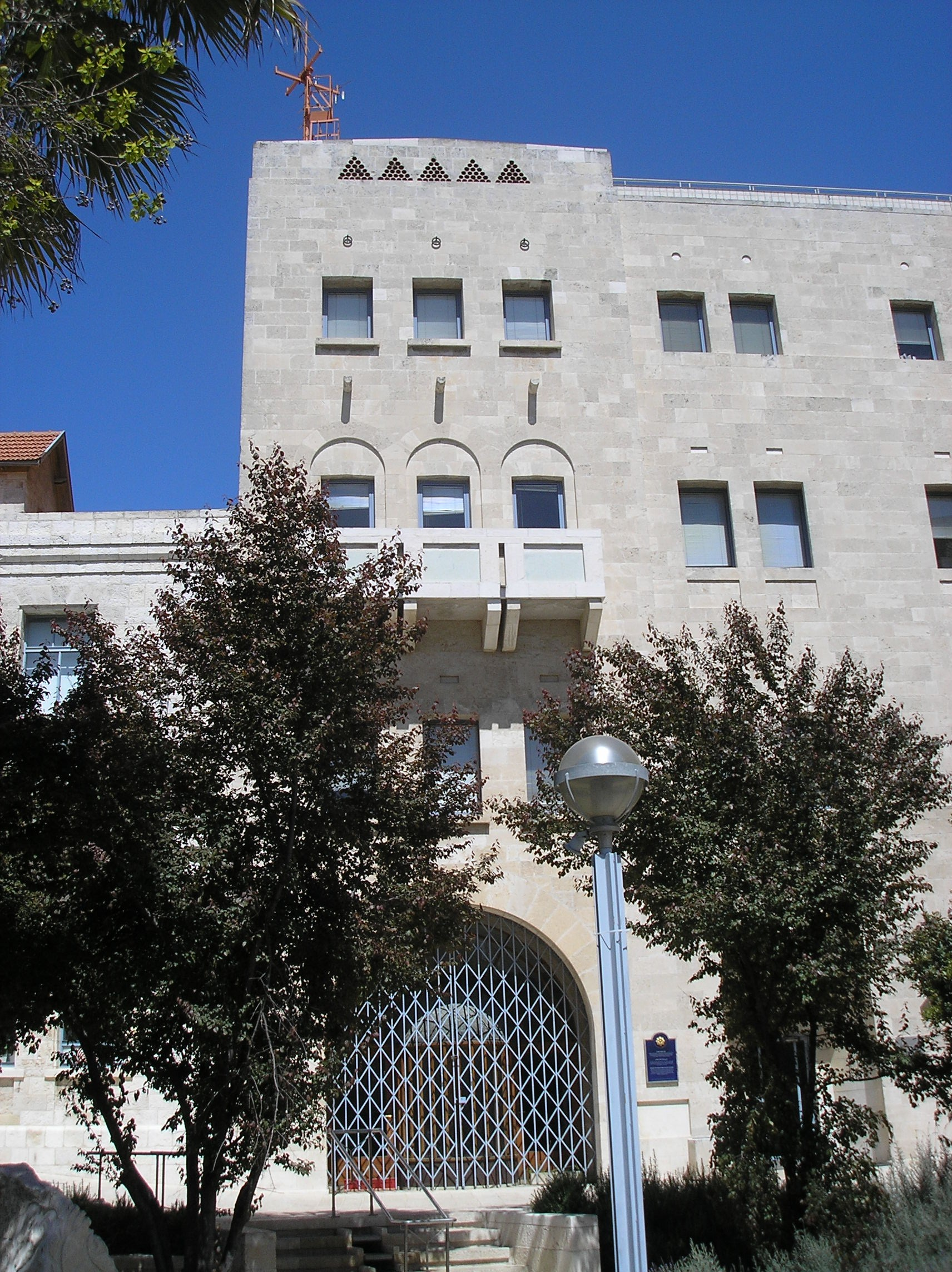
Bible Society Building, design: A. Clifford Holliday's firm, Jerusalem, 1926–28

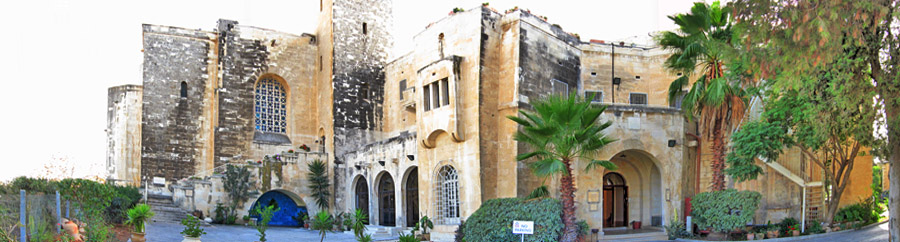
St. Andrew's Church, design: A. Clifford Holliday's firm, Jerusalem, 1930

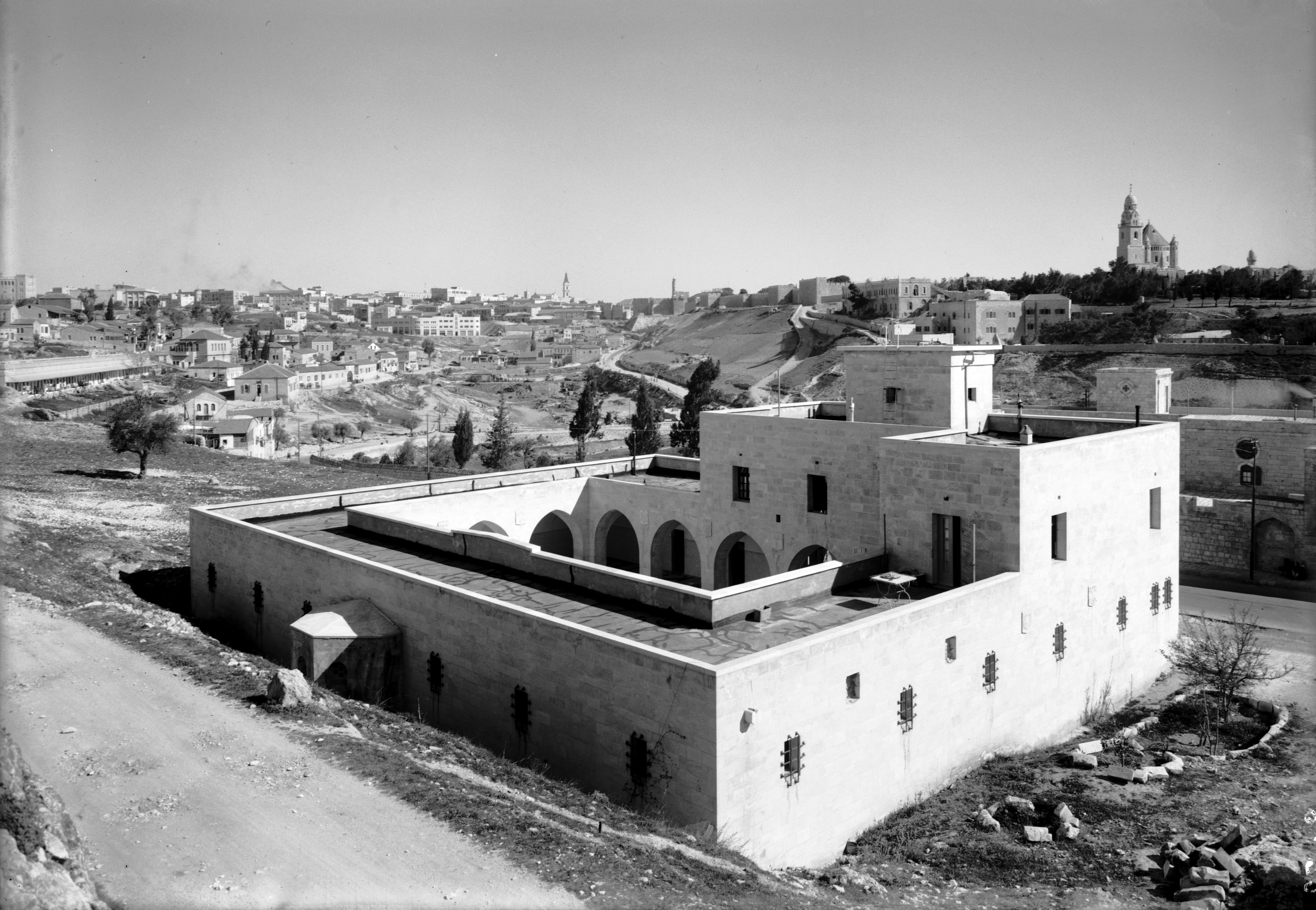
Ophthalmic Hospital Jerusalem, new wing seen from St Andrew's Church, design: A. Clifford Holliday's firm, Jerusalem, 1930

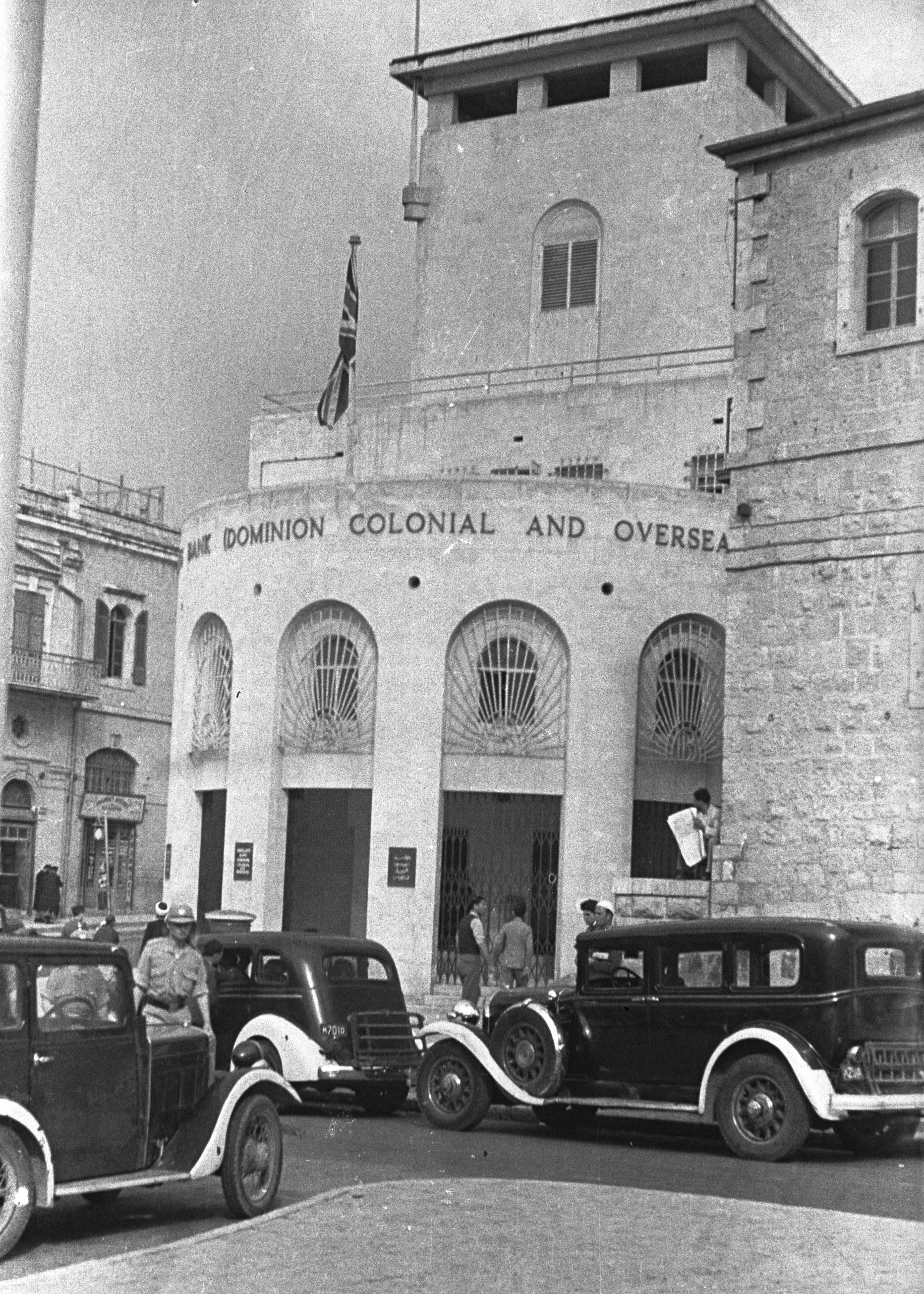
Barclays Bank, design: A. Clifford Holliday's firm, Jerusalem, 1939

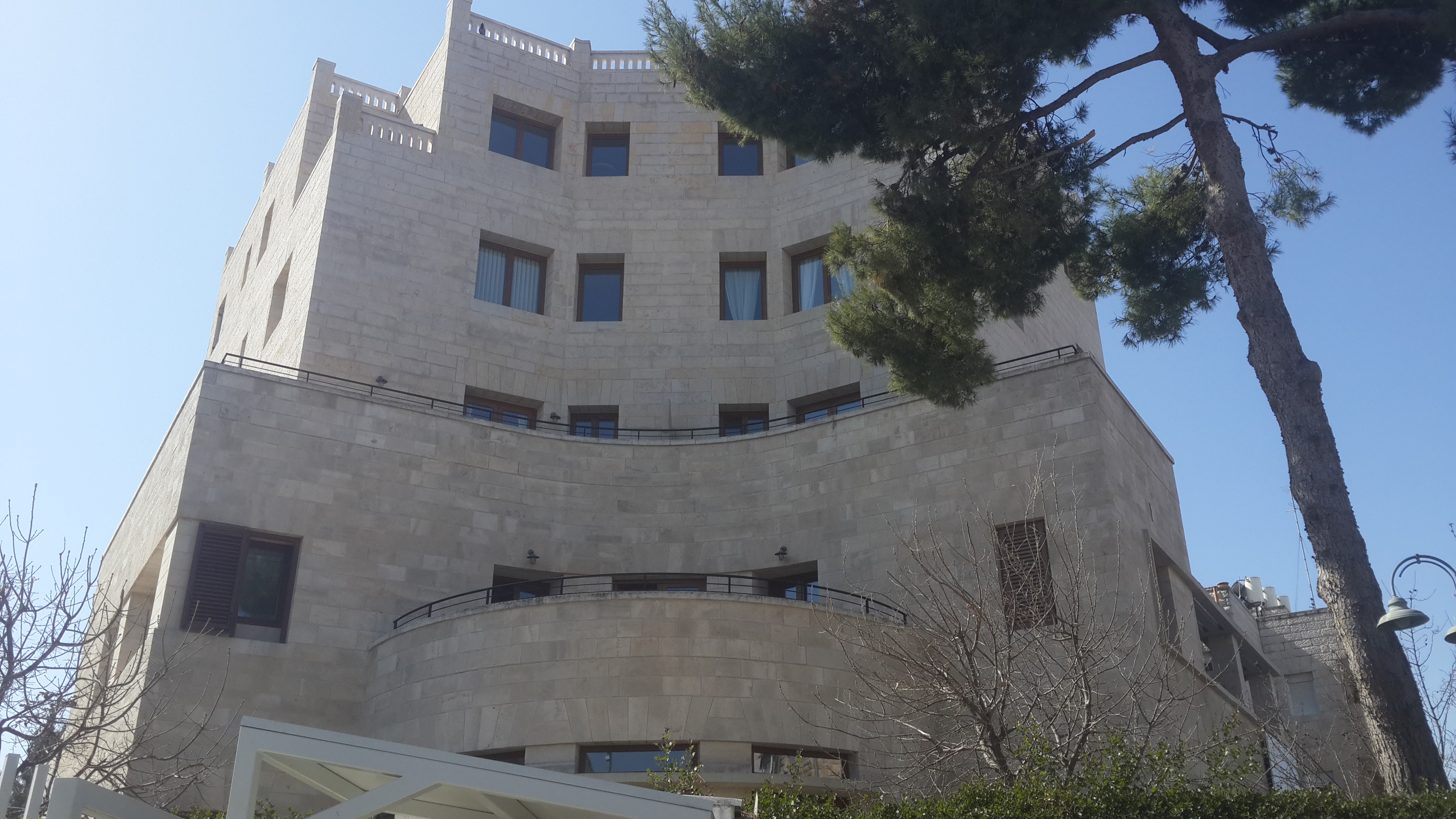
The Salameh House at 2, Balfour Street, 1932 (with new top floors added in the 2010s)
