= Clifford Holliday =

British architect and town planner

Albert Clifford Holliday
- Born: 21 December 1897; Gildersome, England
- Died: 26 September 1960 (aged 62); Manchester, England
- Education: University of Liverpool
- Occupation: Architect
- Design: Master plan of Jerusalem

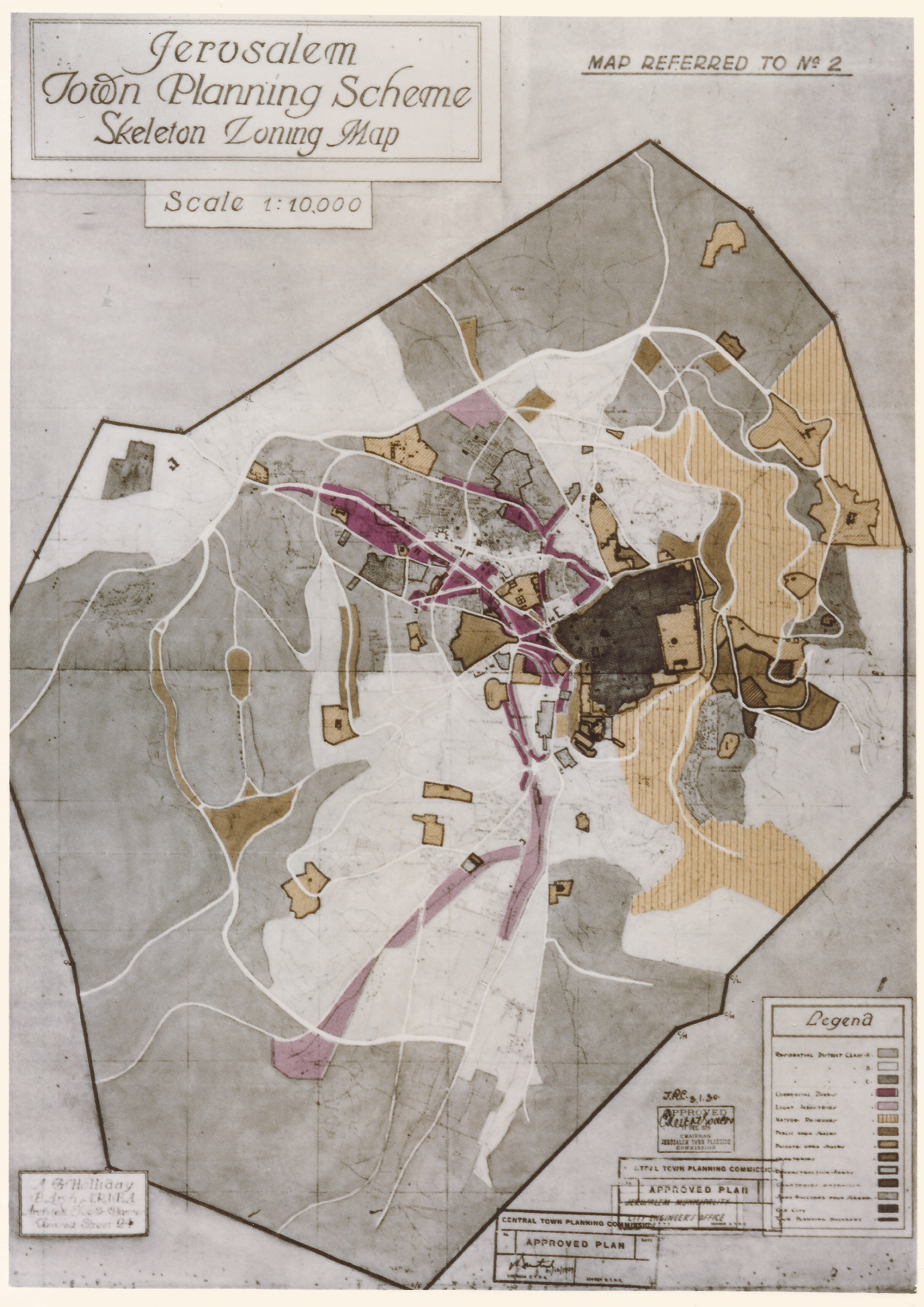
Holliday's city plan for Jerusalem (1930)

Albert Clifford Holliday (1897–1960) M. Arch, Dip. C.D., F.R.I.B.A., M.T.P., was a British architect and town planner who worked in several places across the British Empire, including Mandatory Palestine, Ceylon and Gibraltar, as well as in the UK.

== Studies ==
Holliday gained his qualifications at the University of Liverpool where he studied under Sir Charles Reilly and Patrick Abercrombie. He later designed the University of Ceylon with Abercrombie.

== Career ==
=== Mandate Palestine ===
Holliday was commissioned as civic adviser to the city of Jerusalem between 1922 and 1926 and town planning advisor to the mandatory government of Palestine between 1928 and 1934. He drew up a master plan for Jerusalem and the restoration of its Old City walls.

=== United Kingdom ===
In 1938, Holliday's design for a satellite town near Kincorth, outside Aberdeen, won an international prize.

In 1947, he was appointed Chief Architect for the first postwar British new town, Stevenage. He revised the plan for Stevenage, from the Ministry of Town and Country Planning's original plan, in 1949.

In 1952 Holliday became Professor of Town and Country Planning at the University of Manchester.

He was also involved in preparing the designs for Haslingden and Stoke-on-Trent.

== Private life ==
Holliday had four sons.

== Selected work ==
=== Buildings ===
==== Jerusalem ====
- St John Ophthalmic Hospital's new wing, opened in 1930. Since the 1960s an arts and crafts center, the Jerusalem House of Quality.
- St Andrew's Church, aka the Scots Memorial Church (1930)
- Old Town Hall (1930)
- British and Foreign Bible Society Building (1926-28), 7 Yohanan MeGush Halav Street, now 8 Safra Square, currently housing municipality offices.

==== Elsewhere ====
- University of Ceylon, together with Patrick Abercrombie.

=== Town plans ===
- Colombo
- Gibraltar
- Stevenage New Town

==== In Palestine (1922-35) ====
- Jaffa
- Jerusalem
- Haifa Center–HaShmona railway station (inaugurated in 1937)
- Lydda – C. Holliday in 1829, followed later by Otto Polchek
- Netanya
- Ramla
- Tiberias

== Gallery ==
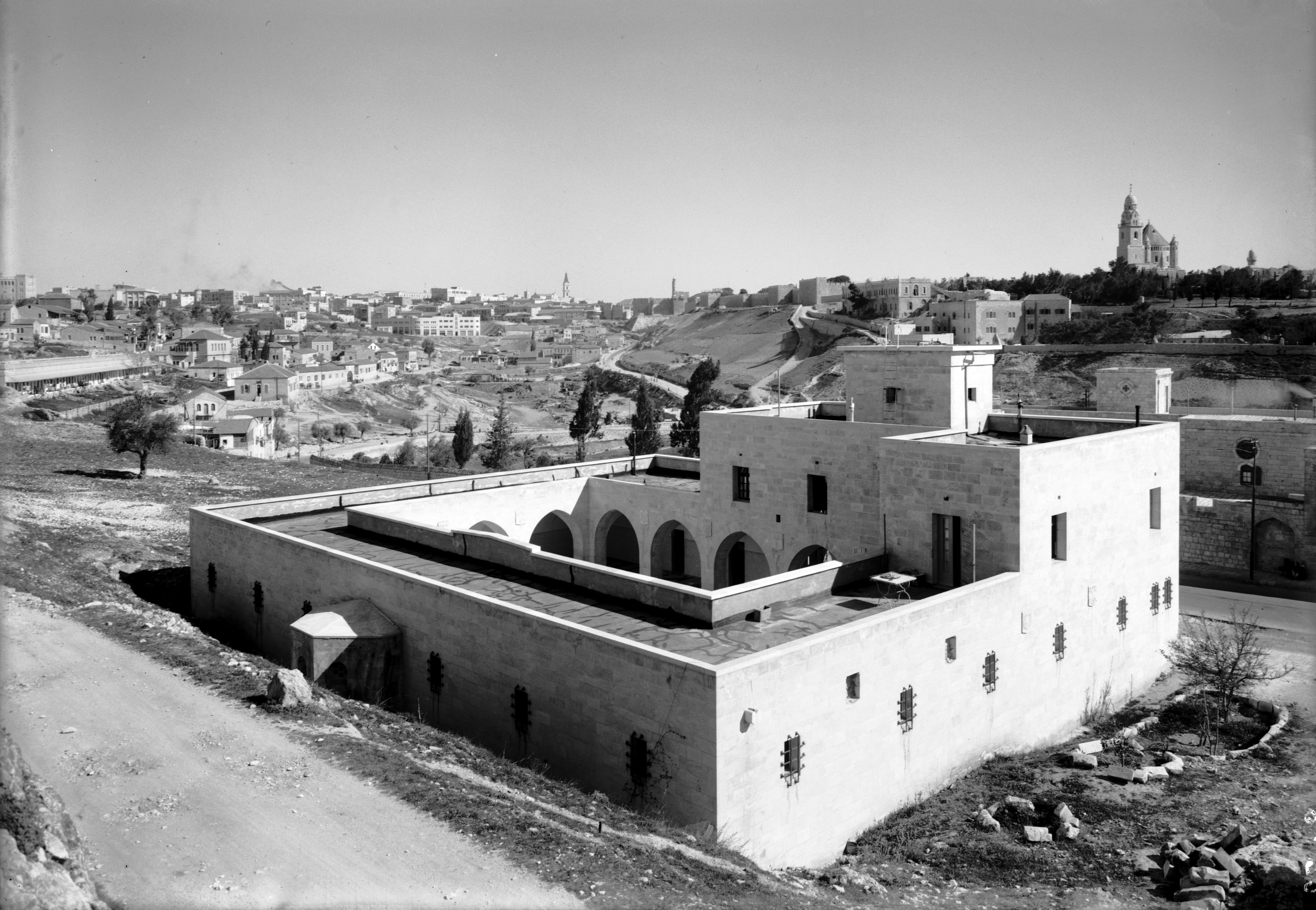
Ophthalmic Hospital Jerusalem, new wing seen from St Andrew's Church (1934-39)

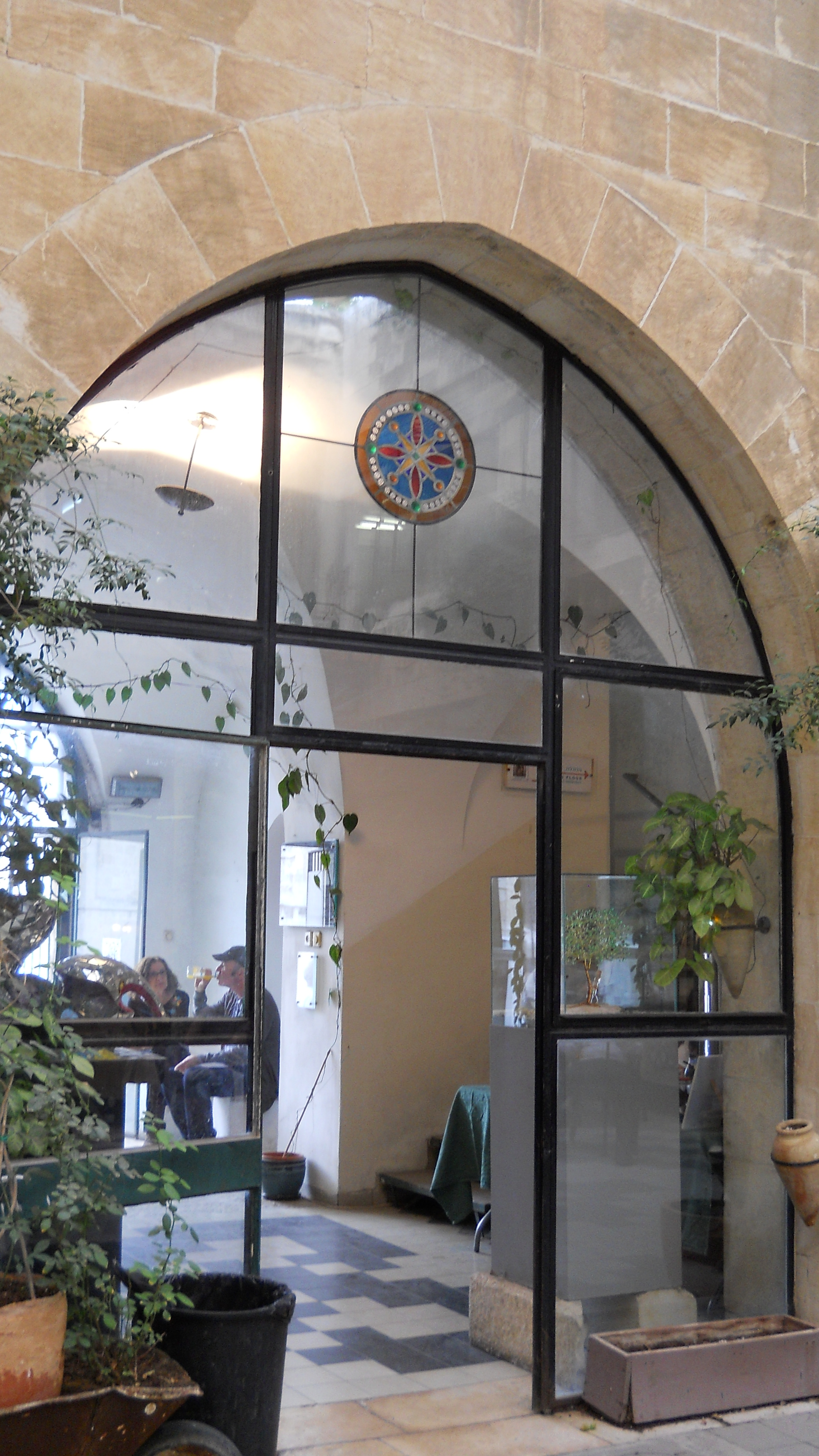
Ophthalmic Hospital, today's Jerusalem House of Quality

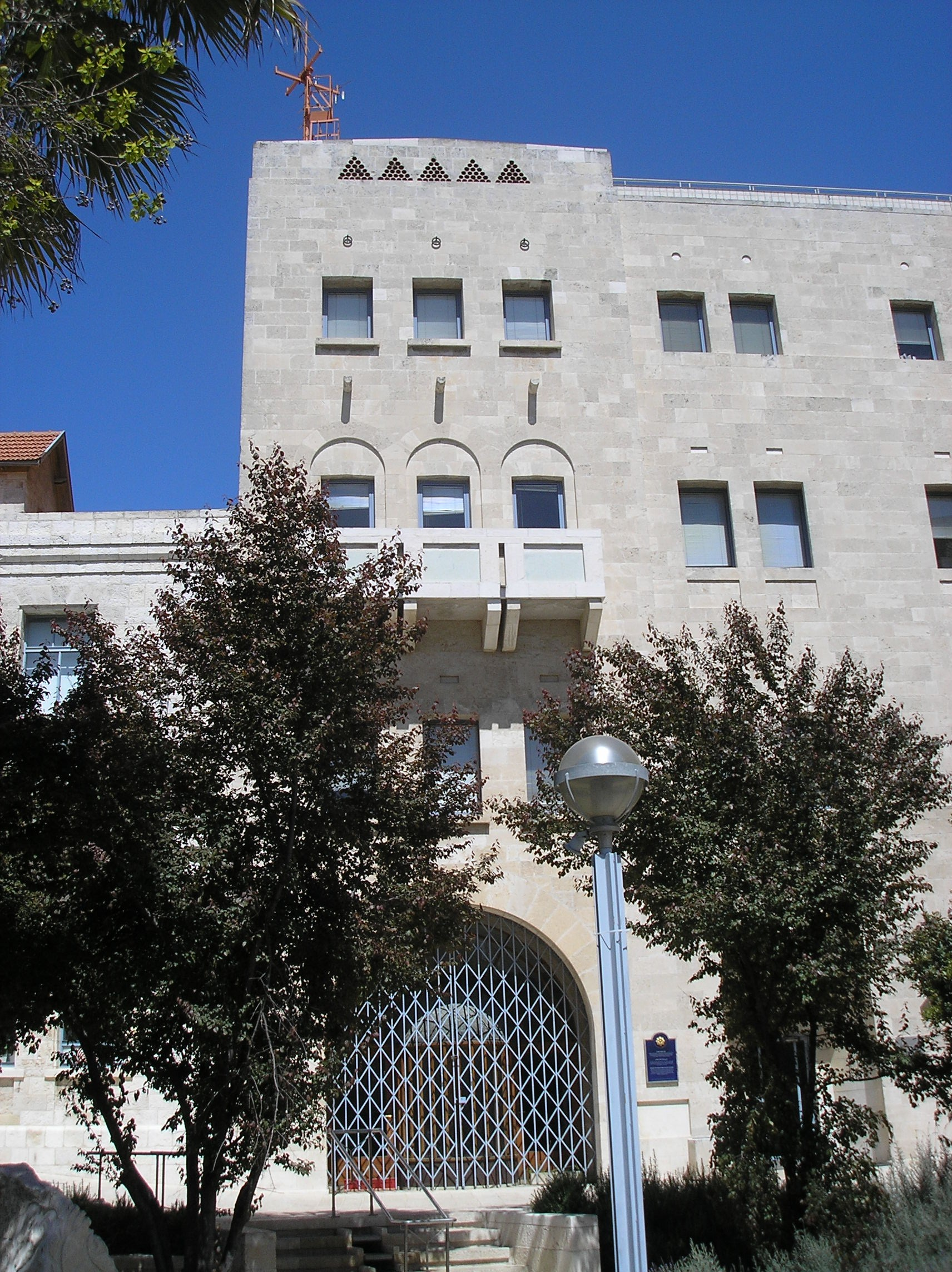
Bible Society Building, design: A. Clifford Holliday's firm, Jerusalem, 1926-28

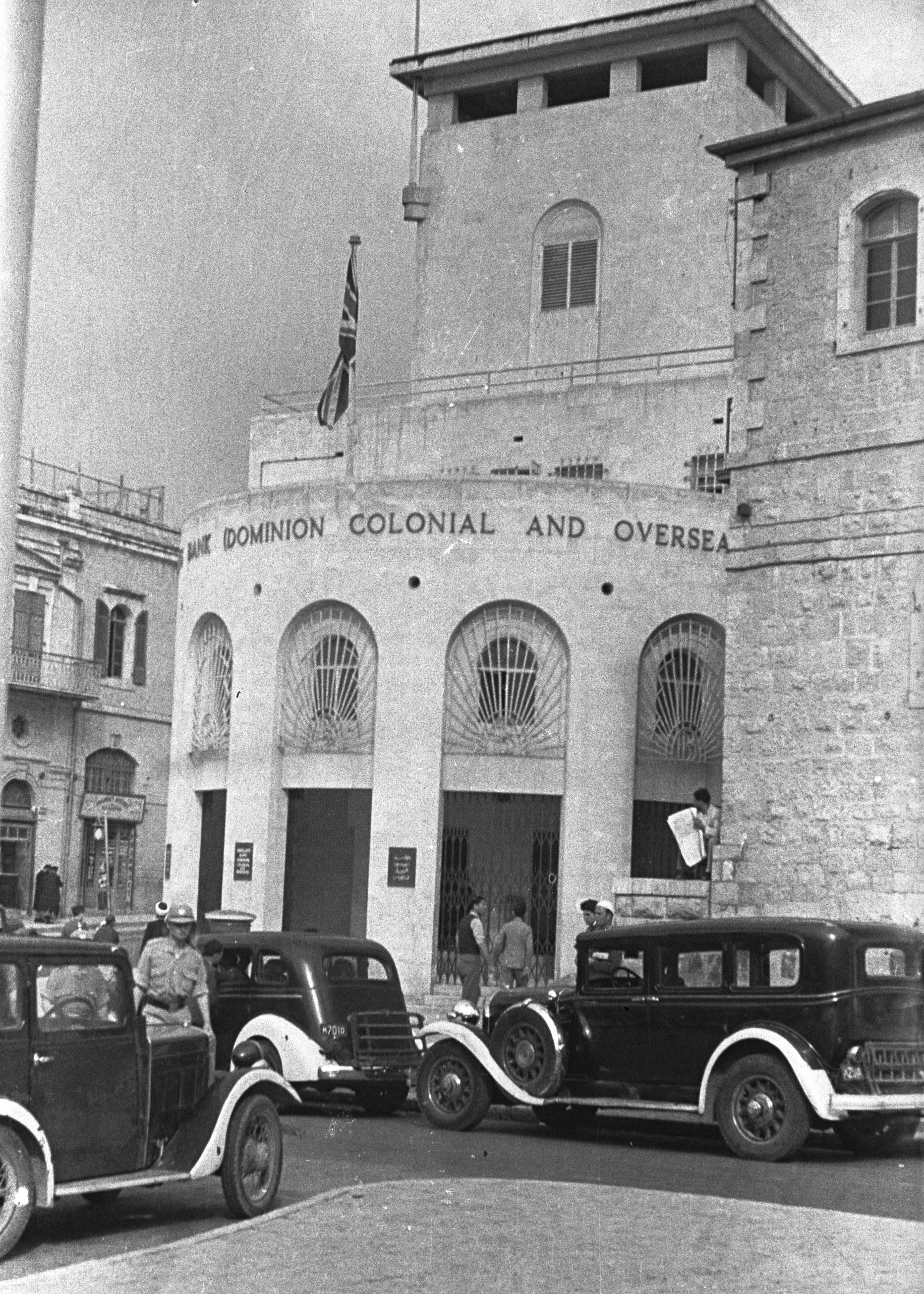
Barclay's building, design: A. Clifford Holliday's firm, Jerusalem, 1939

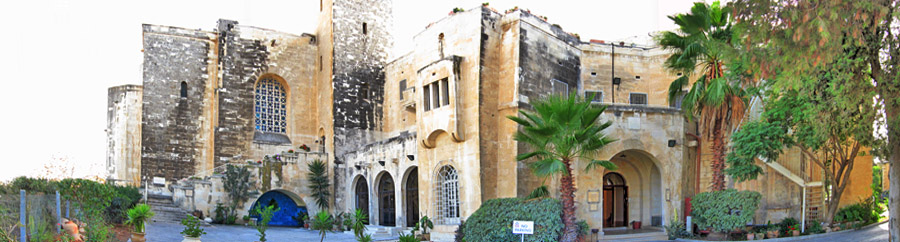
St. Andrew's Church, design: A. Clifford Holliday's firm, Jerusalem, opened 1930

== See also ==
- Charles Robert Ashbee, first British-appointed town planner of Jerusalem (1919-1922)
- Patrick Geddes, designed the master plan for Tel Aviv in 1927
- Zoltan Harmat, Jewish architect who worked both for Holliday's Jerusalem office and privately
- Austin Harrison, British town planner and architect active in Mandatory Palestine
- Richard Kauffmann, Jewish-German town planner and architect active in Mandatory Palestine
- Ernest Tatham Richmond, British architect, Consulting Architect to the Haram ash-Sharif (1918–20)
