= Alexandru Iacob (communist) =

Alexandru Iacob (born Jakab Sándor; 1913–1997) was a Hungarian-born Romanian and Hungarian communist politician and economist, who served as Deputy to Vasile Luca within the Romanian Ministry of Finance, and eventually became a victim of repression in Communist Romania. A member of the Romanian Communist Party (PCR) before and after World War II, he was also clandestinely active within the Hungarian Communist Party (KMP) in Northern Transylvania between 1940 and 1944. In 1952, after having served in the Petru Groza cabinet, he and Luca were accused of "right-wing deviation", stripped of their positions, and incarcerated. Iacob survived confinement, was released in the 1960s, and eventually left Romania for Sweden.

== Biography ==
Iacob was born in the region of Transylvania, five years before the area's union with Romania, into a family of Hungarian Jews. His father died before World War II; his mother fell victim to the Holocaust, being killed at Auschwitz after the 1944 deportations.

Alexandru Iacob became a member of the underground PCR in the early 1930s, but, after the Second Vienna Award assigned Northern Transylvania to Hungary, joined the KMP, becoming its Secretary for the region. He was in hiding during the entire period from June 1941, when Hungary joined the war on the Eastern Front, until the arrival of the Soviet Red Army in September 1944. While in hiding, he recruited some new party members and followers, compensating for the wave of arrests carried out by the Hungarian Regency authorities among communist militants. He also organized the distribution of anti-war leaflets.

After 1944, when Northern Transylvania was effectively reintegrated into Romania, Iacob was again a PCR member and one of its Cluj-based Regional Committee members. He married Magda Farkas, daughter of a prominent Jewish businessman from Cluj who had escaped the Holocaust by hiding in a nearby village. In 1947, he was moved to Bucharest, where he joined the staff of Vasile Luca, Minister of Finance, PCR Secretary and vice-Premier in the Petru Groza cabinet. In 1948, soon after the establishment of a Romanian communist regime, Iacob became Deputy Minister of Finance and acted in that capacity until the spring of 1952, when he was arrested as part of the campaign against the so-called "right-wing deviation". At the trial of Luca and his group, he did not admit to willful wrongdoing (the accusation against him was sabotage). During detention, Iacob was subjected to torture. He was sentenced to 20 years in prison and spent 12 years in solitary confinement. For a while he was sent to Râmnicu Sărat Prison, together with Luca.

He was freed as part of the general amnesty of 1964, decreed by communist leader Gheorghe Gheorghiu-Dej before his death. Iacob's wife had also been arrested in the summer of 1952. She was released in 1954, insane. The defendants of the Luca trial—Luca, Iacob, Ivan Solymos and Dumitru Cernicica were officially rehabilitated in 1968, during the liberalization phase associated with the early years of the Nicolae Ceaușescu regime. Luca and Solymos had died in jail.

Following his release from prison, Alexandru Iacob worked as an economist. In the late sixties he remarried and some time in the 1980s he and his wife were allowed to emigrate to Sweden, where they were well received. He was very nicely treated as a former victim of a totalitarian regime. He died in Stockholm in 1997.
