= Dumitru Cernicica =

Dumitru Cernicica (born Csernicska Demeter; February 28, 1915 – February 11, 2004) was a Hungarian-born Romanian and Hungarian communist politician and engineer, who served in various economic and financial positions in the Romanian Communist government. Being associated with Vasile Luca, Minister of Finance, Secretary of the Romanian Communist Party (PCR) and Vice-Premier, he eventually became a victim of communist repression. A member of the PCR before and after World War II, he was also clandestinely active within the Communist Party of Hungary (KMP) in Northern Transylvania and Budapest between 1940 and 1944. In 1952, he was arrested and charged with being one in Luca's "right-wing deviationist", stripped of all positions (including membership of the Great National Assembly), and incarcerated.

== Biography ==
Dumitru Cernicica was born in Sighetu Marmației (formerly Máramarossziget, in Austria-Hungary) into a family of workers. His father died in 1916, fighting in World War I. As a student, Cernicica had a broad range of interests: science, languages, politics. He became a member of the underground PCR in the early 1930s. As an engineering student, he was president of the PCR-led Frontul Studențesc Democrat (FSD, the Students' Democratic Front) in Cluj.

After the Second Vienna Award assigned Northern Transylvania to Hungary, he joined the KMP. During the Nazi occupation of Hungary in 1944–1945, he escaped being handed over to the Gestapo together with other communists as a result of the actions of Ferenc Keresztes-Fischer, the Hungarian Minister of Interior and of the Hungarian Police's Chief Commissioner József Sombor-Schweinitzer, who refused to cooperate with the occupiers. While being detained in Budapest by the pro-Nazi Arrow Cross regime, Cernicica became friends with László Rajk, the future minister in Communist Hungary and victim of a show trial during the Stalinist terror regime of Mátyás Rákosi. During the Arrow Cross-implemented participation in the Holocaust, Cernicica helped hide his Jewish friends.

After the war, Cernicica was called back to Sighet and reintegrated as PCR secretary. He was instrumental in re-establishing the new Romanian administration after a short-lived attempt to incorporate the Romanian-held southern areas of Maramureș together with the northern areas into the Soviet Union as part of the Ukrainian SSR. Soon, he was appointed to positions in Romania's communist-supported government of Petru Groza. While being true to the communist cause, his principles have put him at odds with party dogmas. During the first conference of the legalized PCR (October 1945), he spoke up against the appointment to the Central Committee of Nicolae Ceaușescu, whose appointment was saved by the prominent PCR activist Ana Pauker. As Comptroller General of the Ministry of Finances and later president of the State Pricing Committee, he was a collaborator of Vasile Luca, who had been assigned the position of Minister and that of vice-Premier.

While heading the State Pricing Committee (Comitetul de Stat pentru Prețuri), Cernicica reported a drop in the standard of living—a conclusion at odds with the official dogma of its "continuous growth". As first vice-president of Centrocoop board, which directed activity in the service area, he promoted paying higher acquisition prices to farmers (position endorsed by Vasile Luca). Caught in the plot initiated by PCR leader Gheorghe Gheorghiu-Dej to eliminate Luca, Dumitru Cernicica was arrested on June 13, 1952. During the "Luca trial" he was accused of acts of sabotage against the national economy. He rejected all the accusations but was sentenced to 3 years of corrective jail. The specific sentences were handed over to the military judges on a note from the Central Committee's Politburo, hand-written by Gheorghiu-Dej's collaborator Iosif Chișinevschi.

Following the arrest, his wife—Viola Hedvig Cernicica (née Harmat, sister of Zoltan Harmat)—was pressured by Gheorghiu-Dej into divorcing him, but she refused. Vasile Luca, Alexandru Iacob, Ivan Solymos, and Dumitru Cernicica, the co-defendants of the trial, were officially rehabilitated in 1968, three years after Ceaușescu's succession to the deceased Gheorghiu-Dej. Only Cernicica and Iacob survived the jail term.

In 1969, Cernicica became vice-president of UCECOM, a board supervising the activity of state-run enterprises. Like most old communists, he was critical of the Ceaușescu regime, on charges of nepotism and micromanagement, and was quickly forced into retirement. After the death of his wife in 1992, Cernicica lived mostly in the United States with his son's family, dividing his time between the United States and Romania.
