= Jerusalem Old Town Hall =

Former municipal building

Coordinates: 31.7792°N 35.2247°E

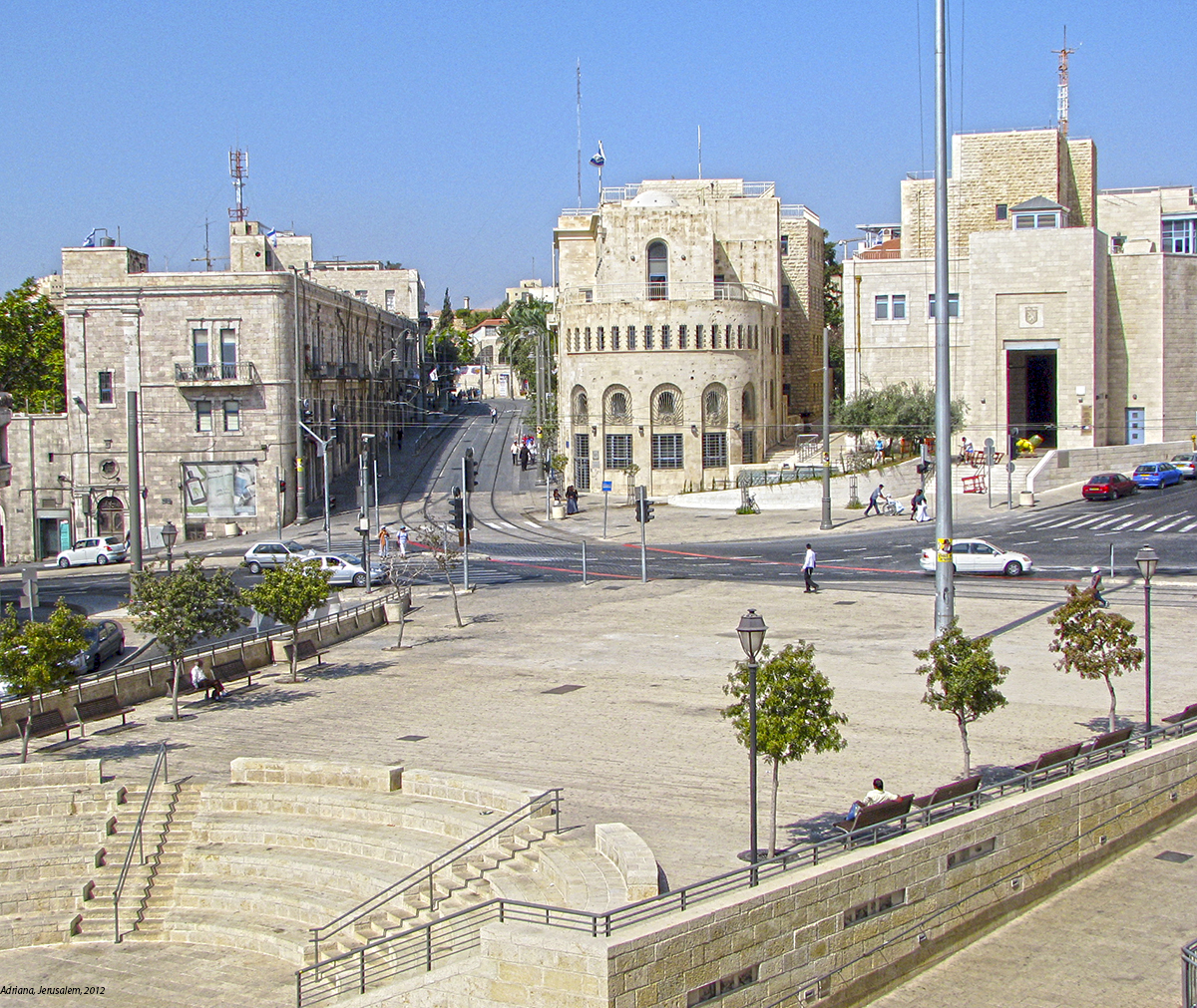
Jerusalem Old Town Hall

Jerusalem's old town hall was one of the four public buildings constructed in Jerusalem by the British administration during the British Mandate.

== History ==
When the town hall at the corner of Jaffa and Mamilla streets became insufficient for the needs of the burgeoning city, the Mandatory government built a new office. It was used by the Municipality of Jerusalem for over 60 years, from 1930 to 1993.

Construction of the building was financed by Barclays Bank, whose offices stood in the rounded section which faces the Old City's northwest corner.

British architect Clifford Holliday designed the building. In 1972, stained glass windows designed by Israeli artist Avigdor Arikha were installed in the City Council Chamber.

== Gallery ==
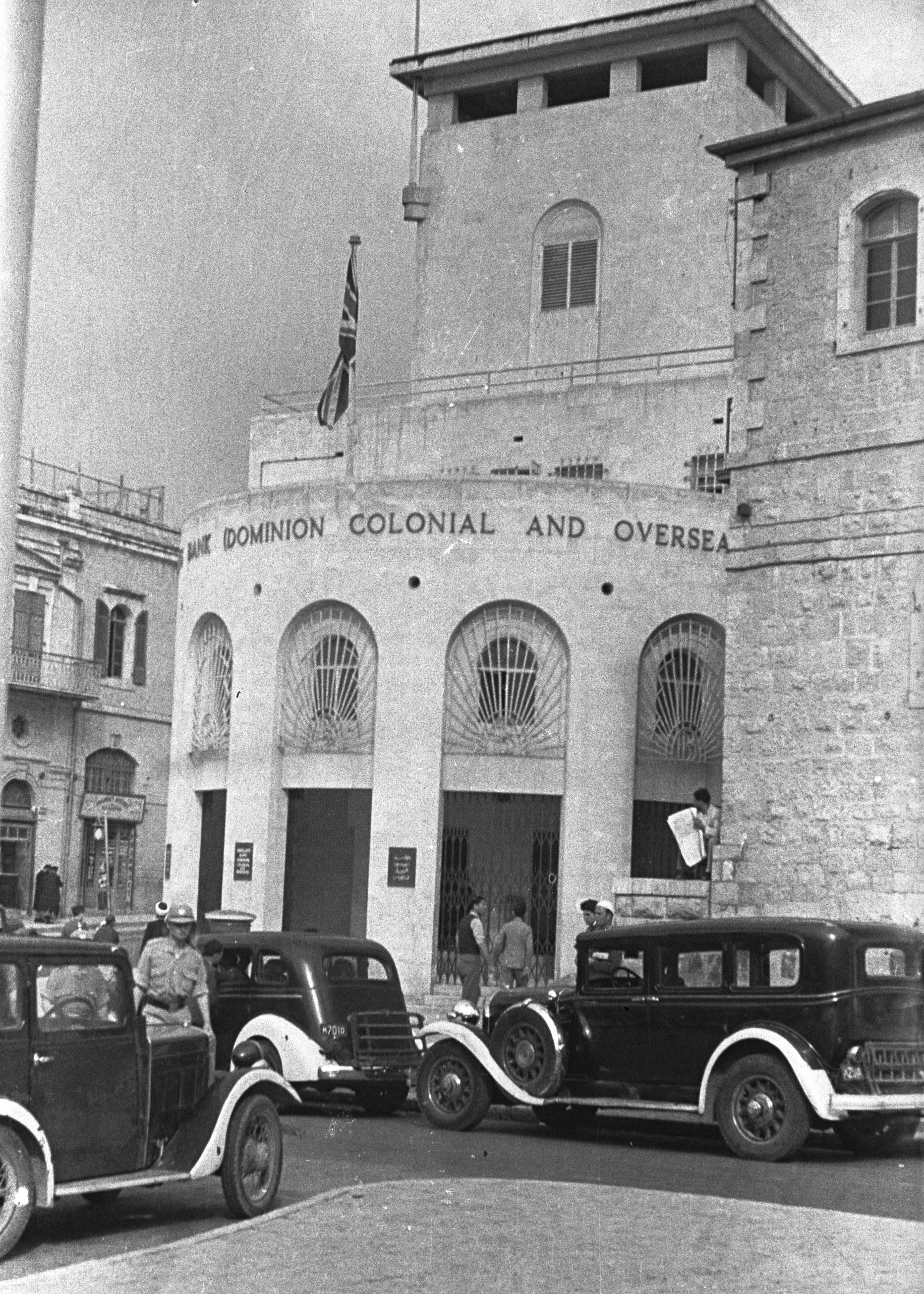
Barclay's bank, 1939

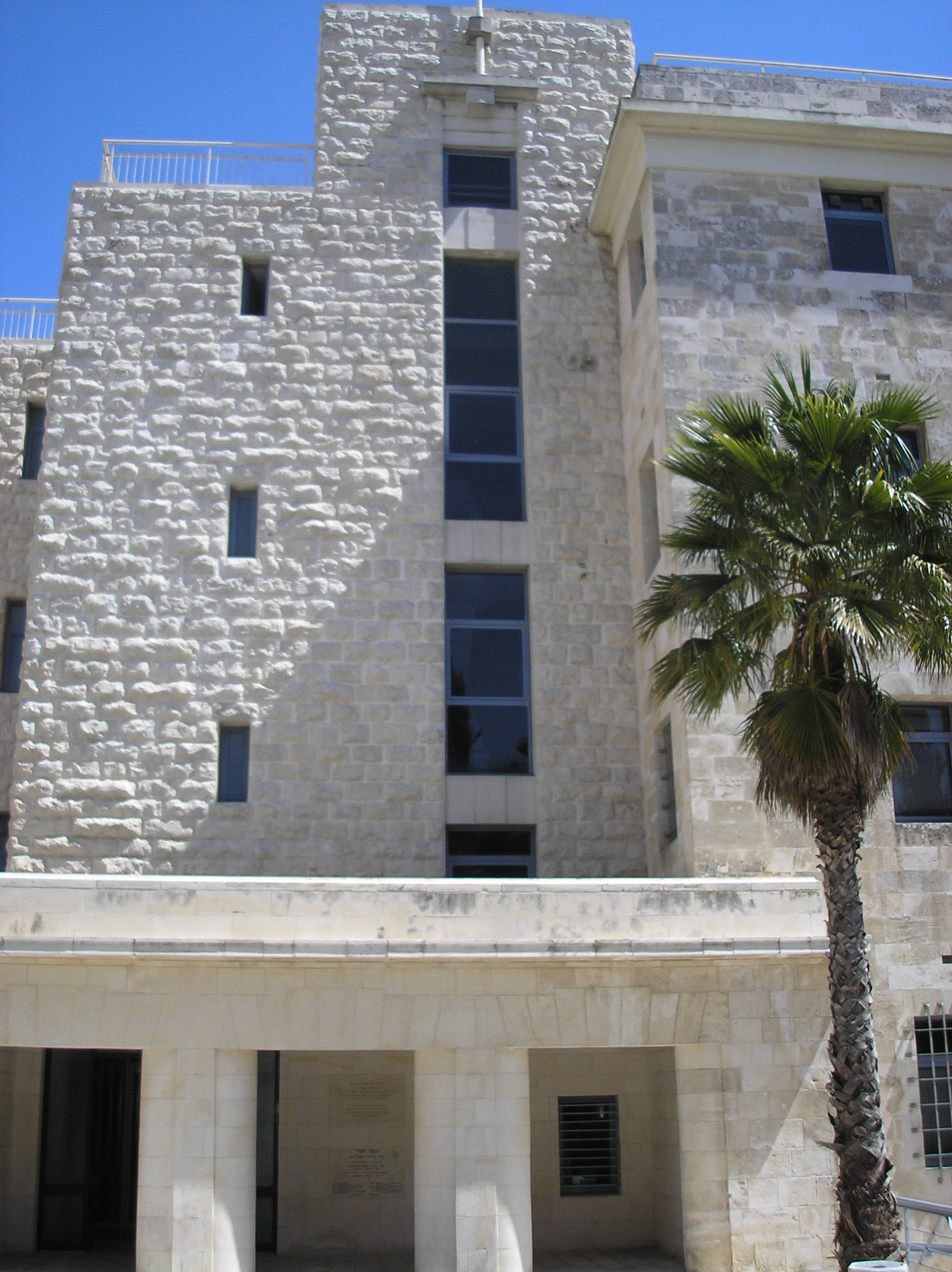
Entrance

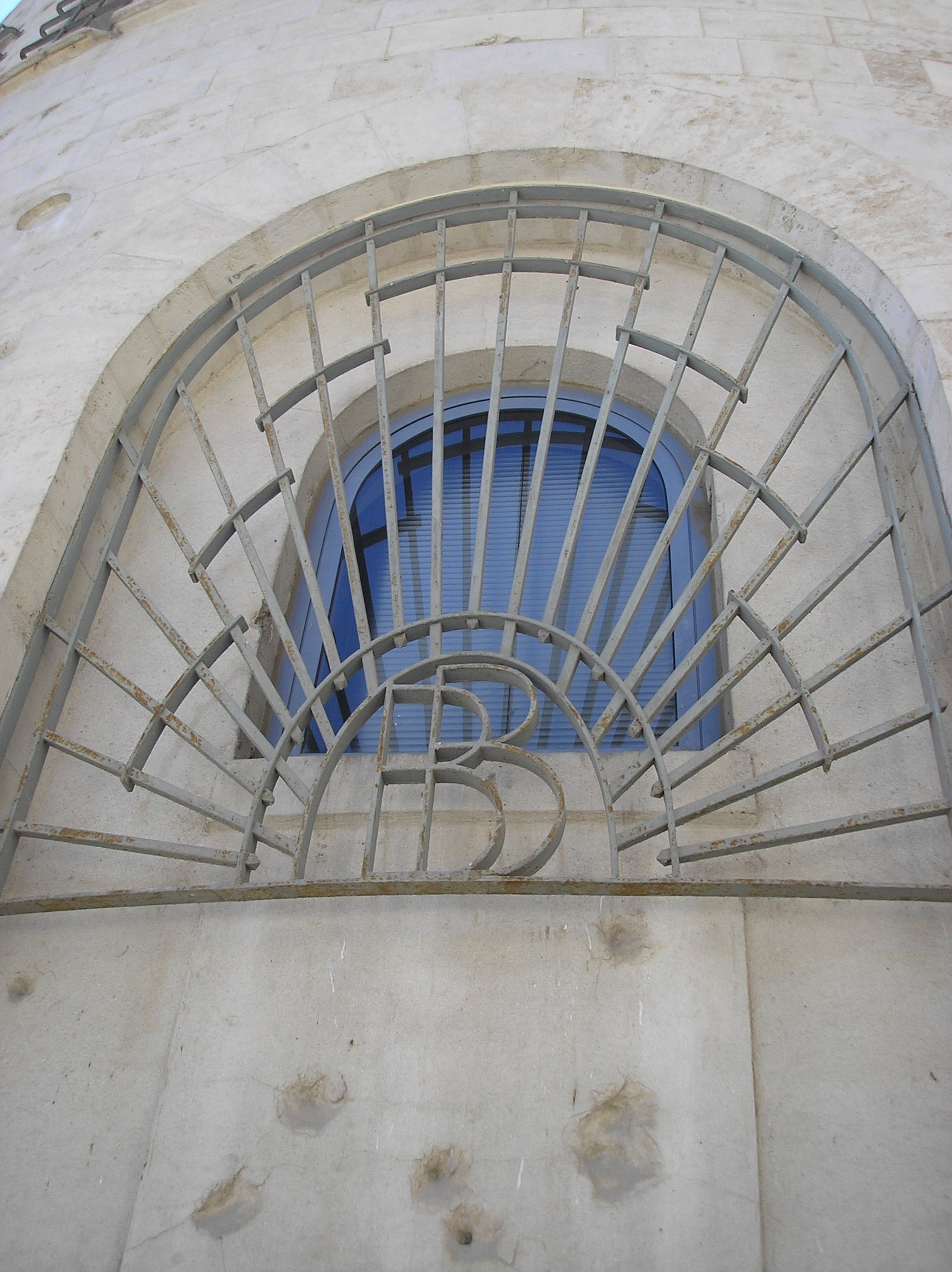
Barclays Bank logo (BB) under a window (southeast facade)

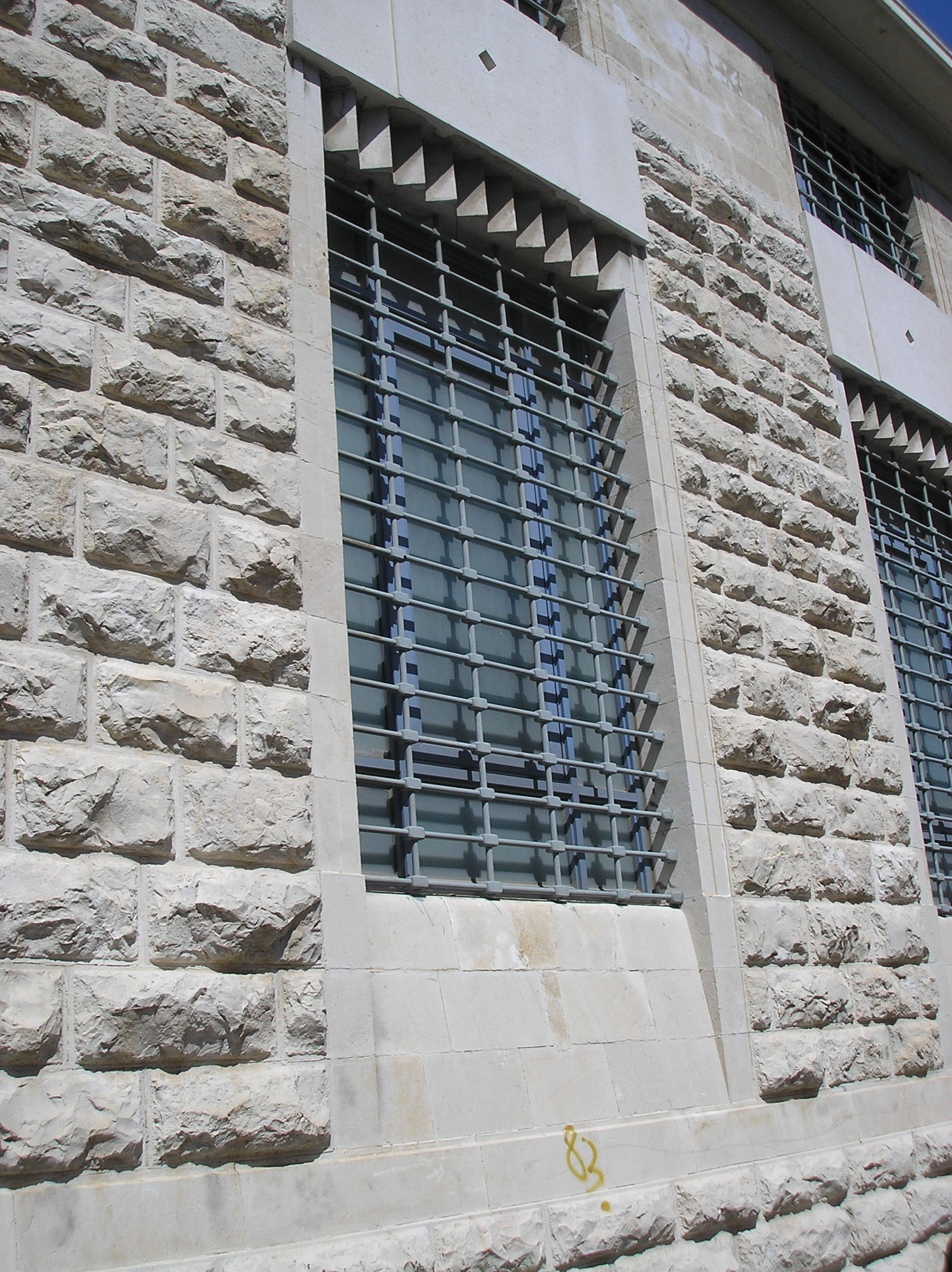
Rusticated masonry and Mamluk architecture-inspired wrought iron window grille

== See also ==
- Architecture of Israel
- Albert Clifford Holliday (1897–1960), British architect whose company drew the plans of the building
- Zoltan Harmat (1900–1985), Hungarian-born Jewish architect who contributed in designing the building
