= Jerusalem Municipality =

Israeli municipality of Jerusalem

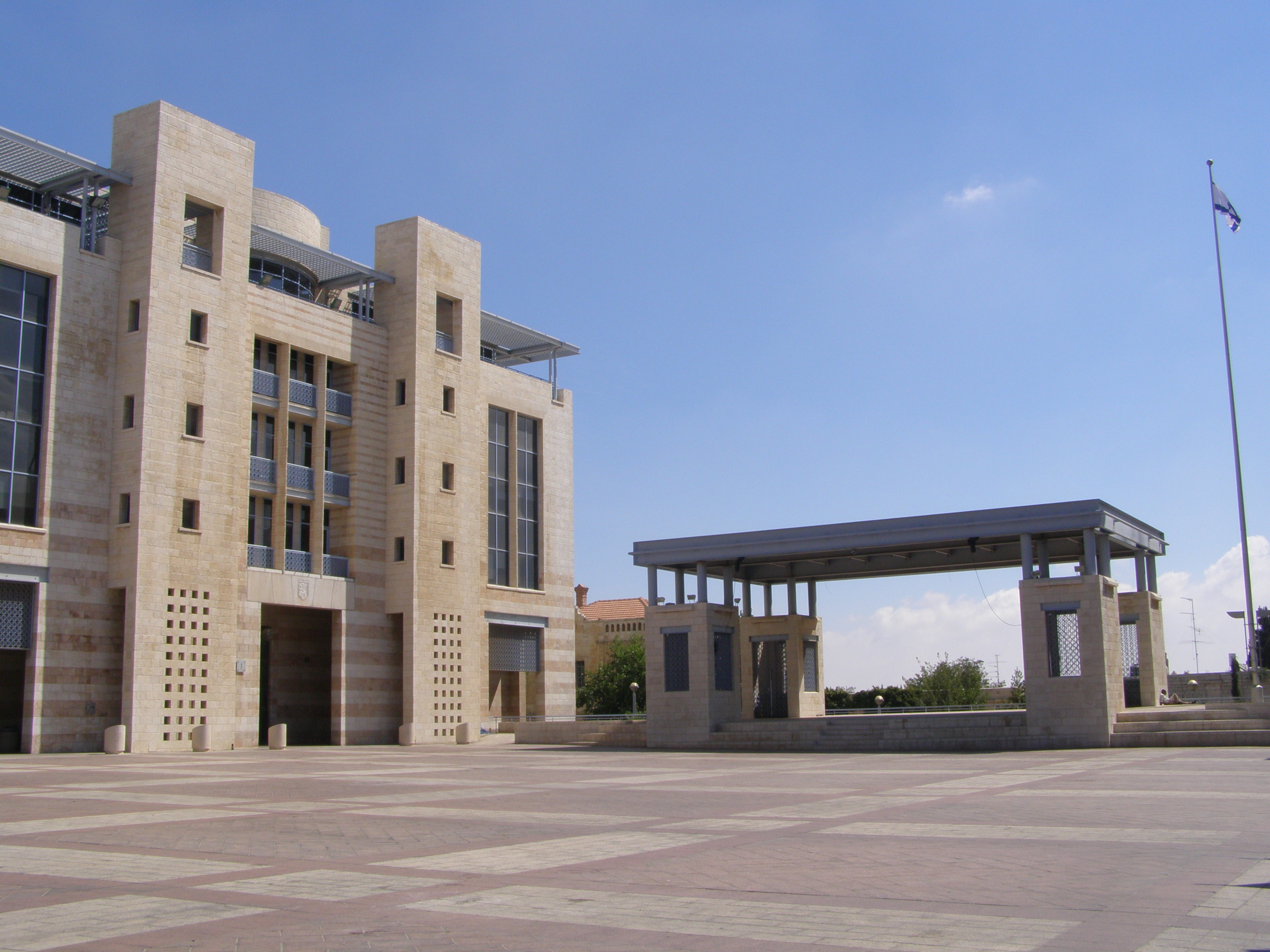
Jerusalem City Hall offices in Safra Square, 2009

The Jerusalem Municipality (Hebrew: עיריית ירושלים, romanized: Iriyat yerushalayim), the seat of the Israeli municipal administration, consists of a number of buildings located on Jaffa Road in the city of Jerusalem.

== History ==
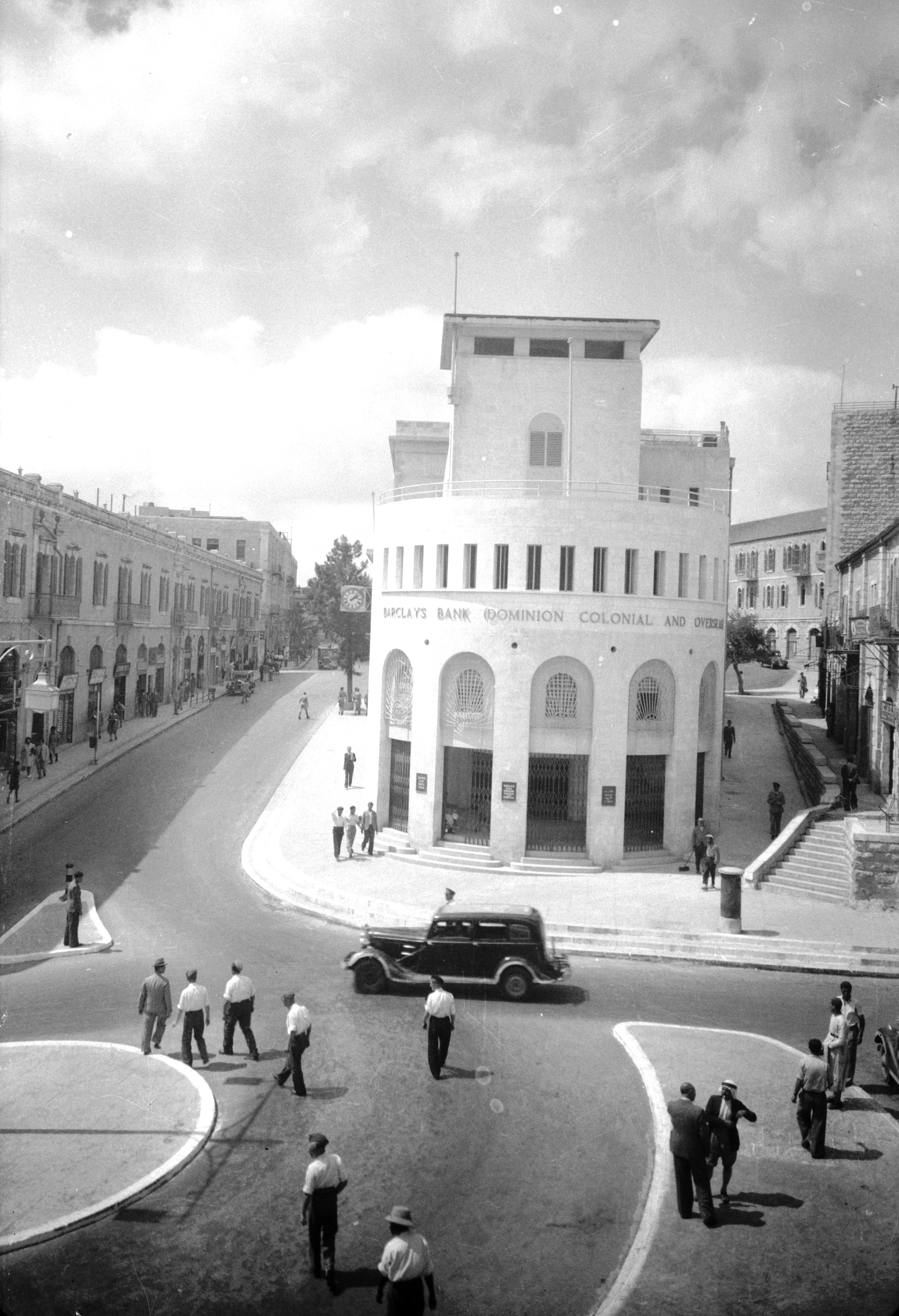
The old British town hall and Barclays Bank, c. 1940

=== British Mandate town hall (1930) ===
Jerusalem's old town hall was built in 1930, during the British Mandate. The construction was financed by Barclays Bank, whose offices were located in the rounded section of the building facing the Old City walls. The building was designed by British architect Clifford Holliday. Stained glass windows designed by Israeli artist Avigdor Arikha were installed in the City Council Chamber in 1972.

=== Israeli municipality compound (1990s) ===
The new complex of the Jerusalem municipality was built in the 1990s in Safra Square. Offices were previously located in 32 different buildings around the city. As the site is at the historic centre of the city, various measures were taken to meet the practical needs of the town hall without damaging the architectural and historical character of the district. A number of historical buildings were renovated and two modern buildings were constructed.

== Municipal seal ==
The municipality's "seal of the city of Jerusalem"

Shortly after the founding of the State of Israel, the municipality of West Jerusalem, under the administration of then-mayor, initiated a design contest among local graphic designers for an official municipal seal. The winning design was submitted in 1949 and officially adopted in February 1950. It was created by a team led by the renowned typographer and artist Eliyahu Koren, who was then serving as the head of the Jewish National Fund’s graphics department.

The seal’s design consists of a heraldic shield featuring the Lion of Judah in a rampant position, representing the historical Tribe of Judah and the Davidic line. The lion is superimposed on a stylized stone background representing the Western Wall (the Kotel). The shield is flanked on either side by olive branches, symbolizing the city's aspiration for peace. Above the shield is the Hebrew-language word for Jerusalem (ירושלים, Yerushalayim), set in a distinct typeface characteristic of Koren's influential work in Hebrew typography.

== See also ==
- Architecture of Israel
