= Safra Square =

Square in Jerusalem

Coordinates: 31°46′49.49″N 35°13′25.99″E

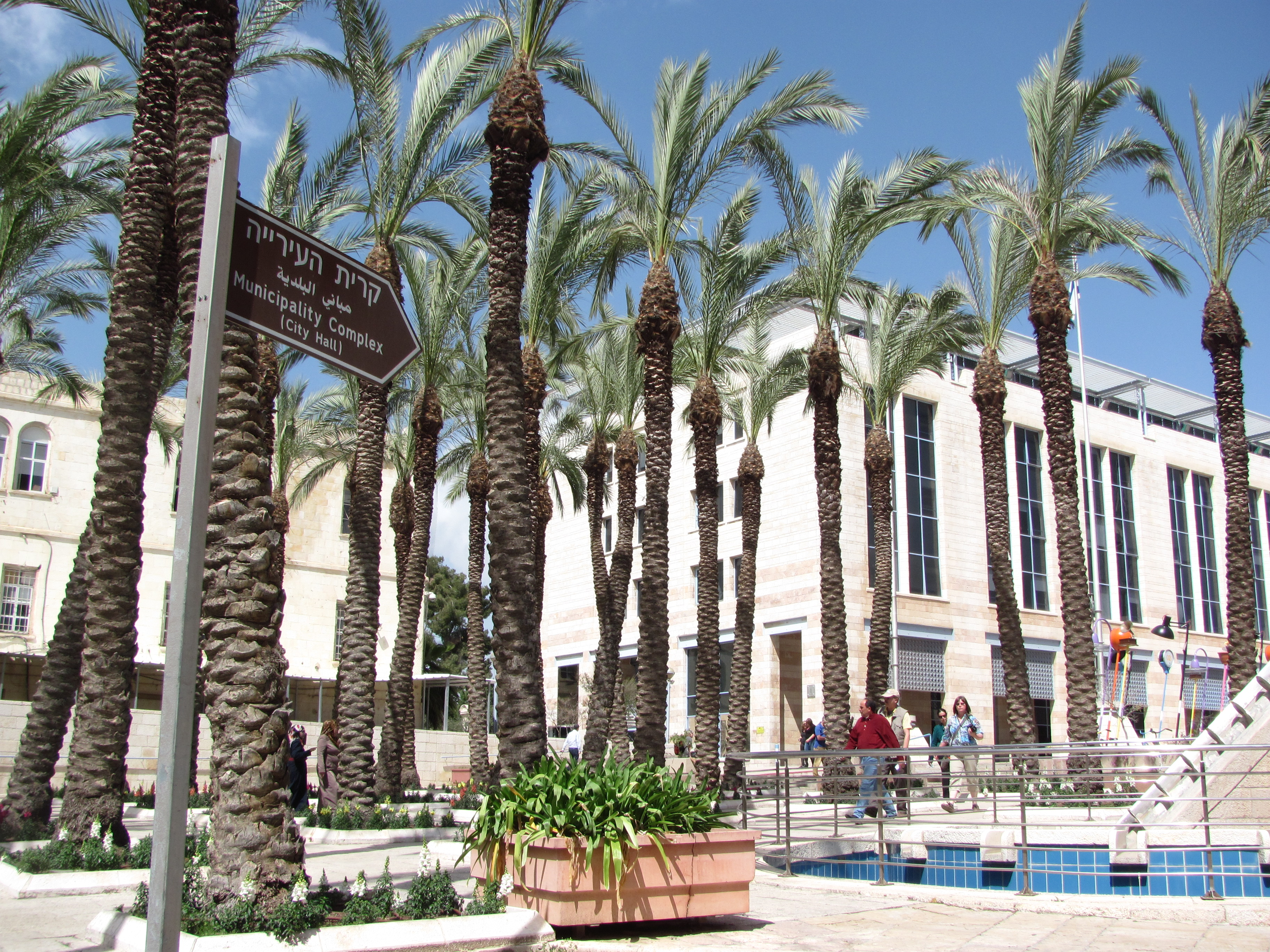
Safra Square with palm trees alley and city hall in background, right

Safra Square (Hebrew: כיכר ספרא, Kikar Safra) is a city square in Jerusalem. It is the site of the Jerusalem Municipality complex, which houses the municipal administration. Safra Square is located in a central part of the city, near the former seam line between West and East Jerusalem (though falling entirely west of it), a site chosen to symbolize its goal of serving all residents of Jerusalem. The administrative compound including the square was inaugurated in 1993.

== Name ==
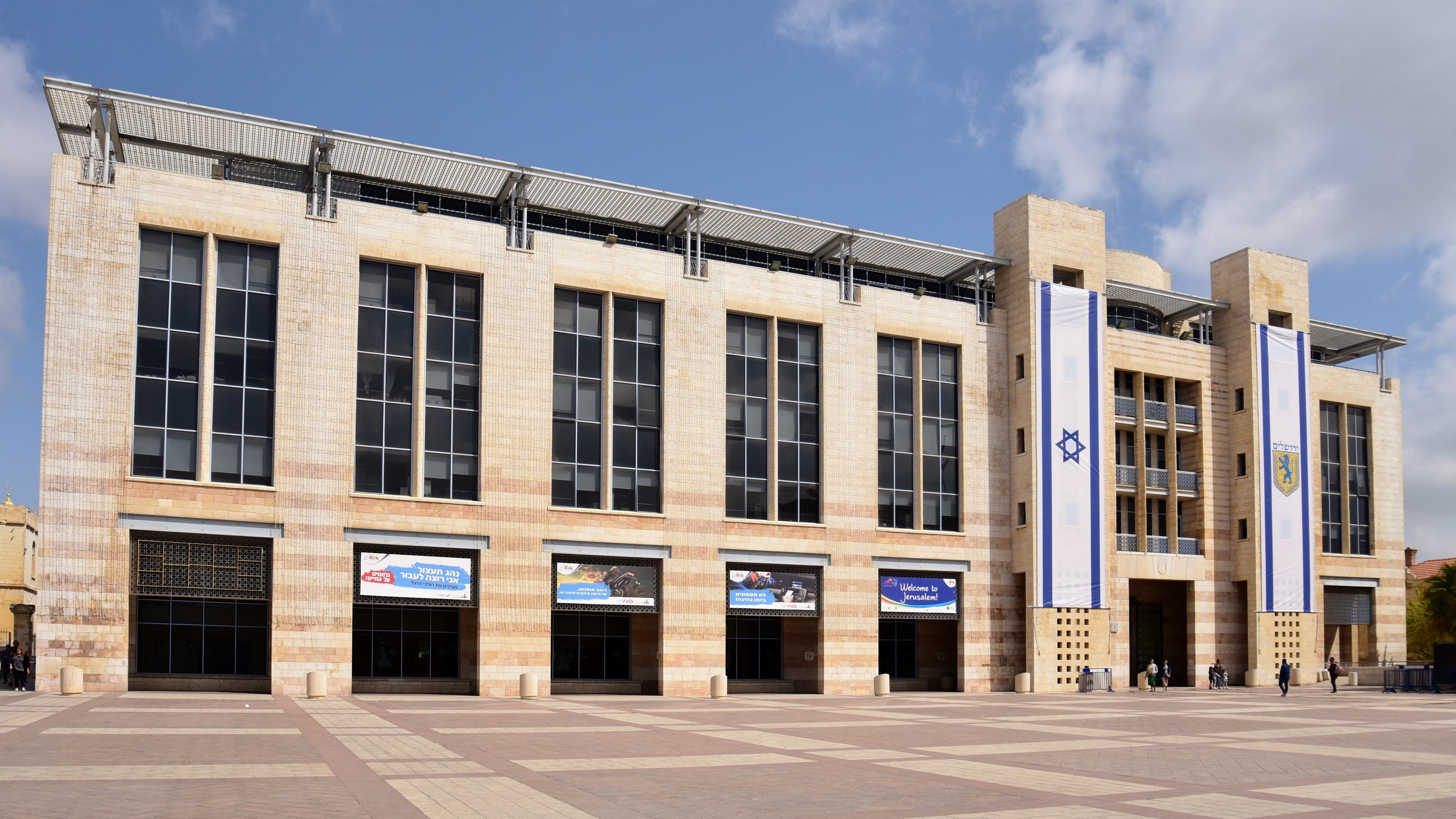
Jerusalem City Hall in Safra Square.

The square was named for the Syrian-Jewish banker Jacob Safra (1891–1963) and his wife Esther, parents of Edmond J. Safra. Edmond Safra (1932–1999), a philanthropist, has been one of the leading contributors to the fund, which re-built the area of downtown Jerusalem.

== Location ==
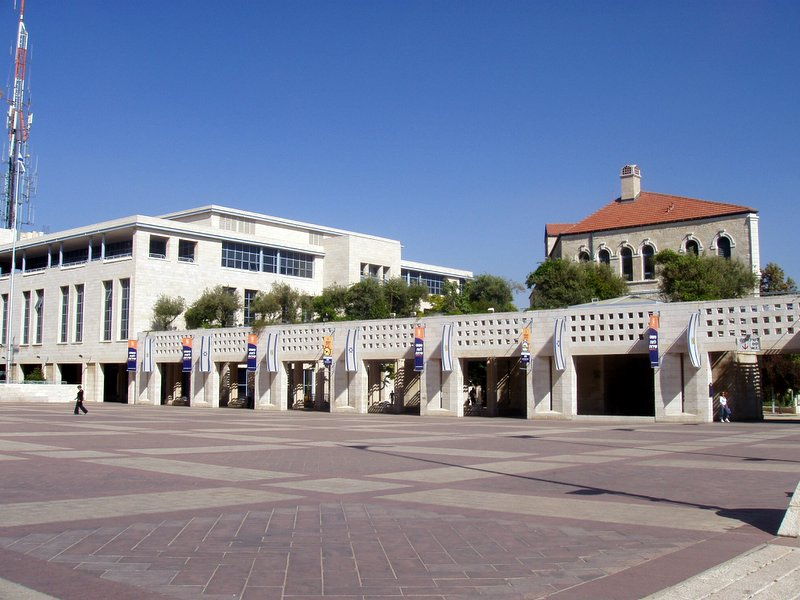
Safra Square's main plaza

The Municipality buildings around Safra Square create a triangular compound, facing the north-west/south-east running Jaffa Road and bordered on the east by the Shivtei Yisrael ("Tribes of Israel") Street. The wedge-shaped compound is located at the eastern end of Jaffa Road and is pointing towards Tzahal Square and the walls of the Old City. Some of the historic buildings of the Russian Compound were restored and incorporated into the municipal complex, while the others, grouped around the Holy Trinity Cathedral, are closing the triangle from the north-west.

== History ==
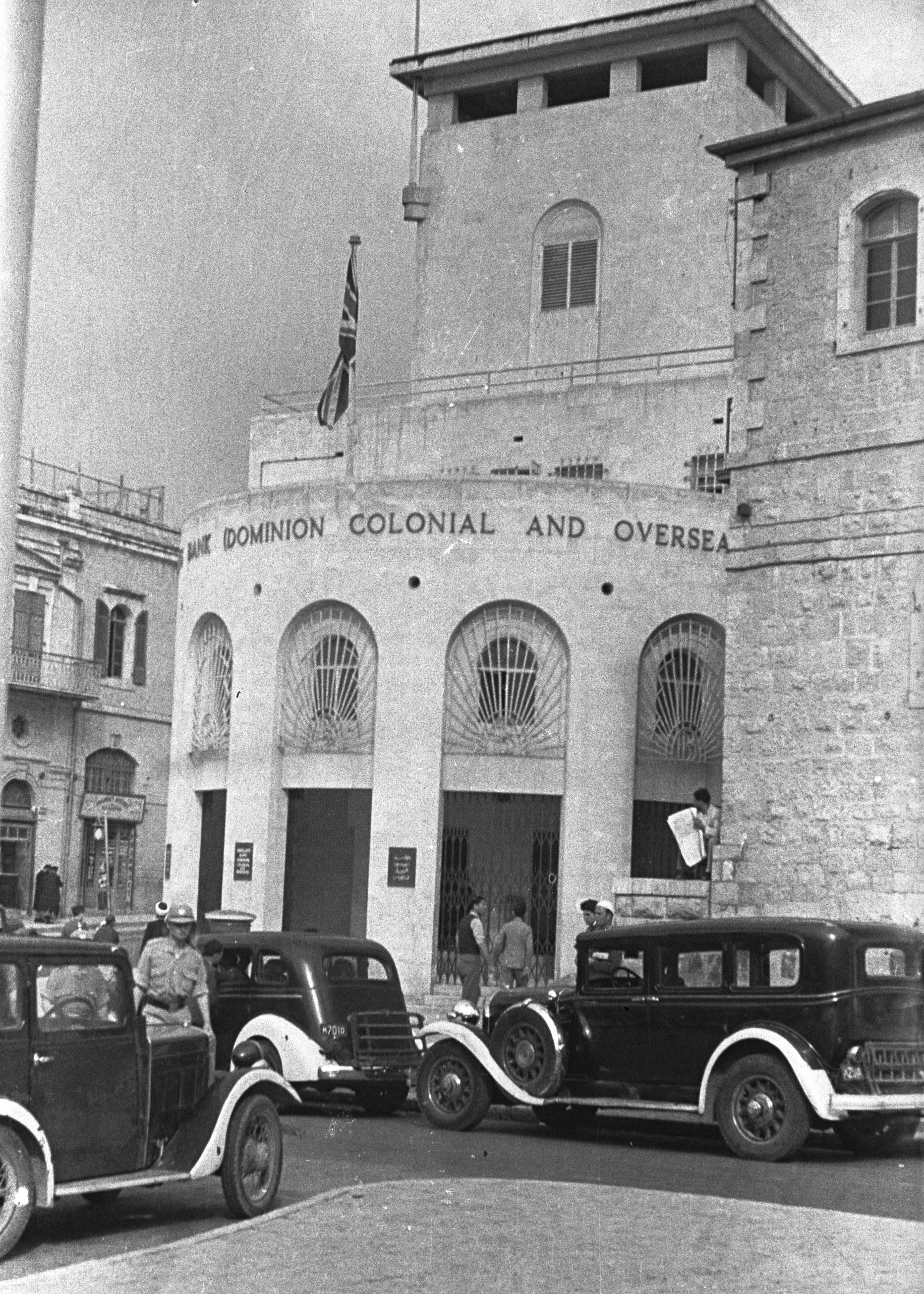
The British Mandate-period Jerusalem City Hall, 1939

The British Mandate-period Town Hall was built in 1930. Today it forms the eastern tip of the compound. As the city grew, along with the need to provide more modern and diverse services to an expanding and equally diverse population, the city government's offices expanded as well, and were spread throughout the city. The decentralized municipal government decreased in efficiency, and it was decided that a single building was needed to house Jerusalem's local government. After lengthy deliberations, the current location was selected, despite the challenge of preserving the large number of historic and culturally significant 19th-century buildings.

The Canadian Jewish architect Jack Diamond and the Israeli architectural firm of Kolker, Kolker, and Epstein were selected to design a project for a unified Jerusalem Municipality complex, consisting of three new buildings, to be integrated with an existing ten buildings to form a cohesive, unified site. The ten existing buildings would be preserved and rehabilitated in order to retain a sense of the historic character of the city. Construction began in 1988 and the complex was inaugurated in 1993.

== Buildings and plaza ==
The complex was planned in the 1980s to contain three new buildings and to integrate ten older ones.

- No. 1. Main new, six-story building. Mayor's office, city council hall, and model of old/new Jerusalem. The 1900s plan included city management and treasury's public reception halls, city engineer offices, department for city improvement, and an automation company. Resident services are now offered on the first floor. An observation point offering a great view of Jerusalem extends from the sixth floor.
- No. 2. Former Russian consulate (1860), later an obstetrics hospital, in the 1990s housing the Jerusalem Development Authority and Moriah Jerusalem Development Corporation.
- No. 3. New secondary building, housing the Education Department.
- No. 4. The Zoology Building (built end of 19th century), the former Zoology Department of the Hebrew University, repurposed to house the enforcement department and the department for municipal and strategic planning, planned to be used by the elected "house of representatives".
- No. 5-6. The Bergheim and Darouti Buildings. Both small, current No. 5 (at the back) was the home of a converted German Jew, Melville Peter Bergheim, who established the first bank in Jerusalem. During the British Mandate it became the rear wing of the Darouti Hotel (now No. 6, at the front), owned by a Christian Arab. No. 5 houses the offices of the coalition parties and the mayor's consultants; building No. 6 is used by the plaza management and for commercial uses.
- No. 7-9. Building No. 7, the "Bagel Building", named after a bagel bakery which used its southern part in the 1960s. The western facade was preserved, with the rest being rebuilt as one unit. It houses the Welfare Department.
  - No. 8. The British and Foreign Bible Society Building (built 1926–28), now 8 Safra Square (former 7 Yohanan MeGush Halav Street), had the first elevator in Jerusalem.
  - No. 9, part of the Bagel Building, serves as a shopping mall with a roofed central space.
- No. 10. The Old Town Hall (1930s–1993) & Barclays Bank. In 1932 the mayor's office and the council hall moved in. It was emptied in March 1995 and renovated while preserving its historical elements. Houses the Departments of Public Health, Sports, and Culture since March 1997.
- No. 11-12. The Armenian Buildings on 17 and 19 Jaffa Street (built at the beginning of the 20th century), property of the Armenian Patriarchate of Jerusalem, partially leased to the municipality, were planned in the 1990s to be renovated.
- No. 13. The former Russian Hospital (1863) was used during the 1948 War for wounded Israeli soldiers, which led to the Hebrew nickname of Avi-Hayil or Avichail, 'father of the soldiers'. Used in the 1990s as a laboratory for the Ministry of Health and for Hadassah Medical Center, with the city council parties using the top floor. The pre-1998 plan was to renovate it, tear down the adjoining building, and build a new office building to be used by the municipal Gihon company (Jerusalem area's water and wastewater operator). It now houses municipal offices.

The plaza is used for gatherings and shows. It includes:

- The Stage Building at the eastern side of the plaza, with an elevated platform and dressing rooms underneath.
- The pergola at the southern part of the plaza, functioning as a "transparent passage" to the Triangular Garden and towards IDF Square (Hebrew: ככר צה"ל, Kikar Tzahal), built over concrete pillars bearing stone flowerpots.
- The Triangular Garden between buildings No. 3, 4 and the pergola, paved with red bricks. Restaurants and coffeehouses were planned for the site.
- The Daniel Garden, named after former mayor Daniel Auster.

== Decoration and public art ==
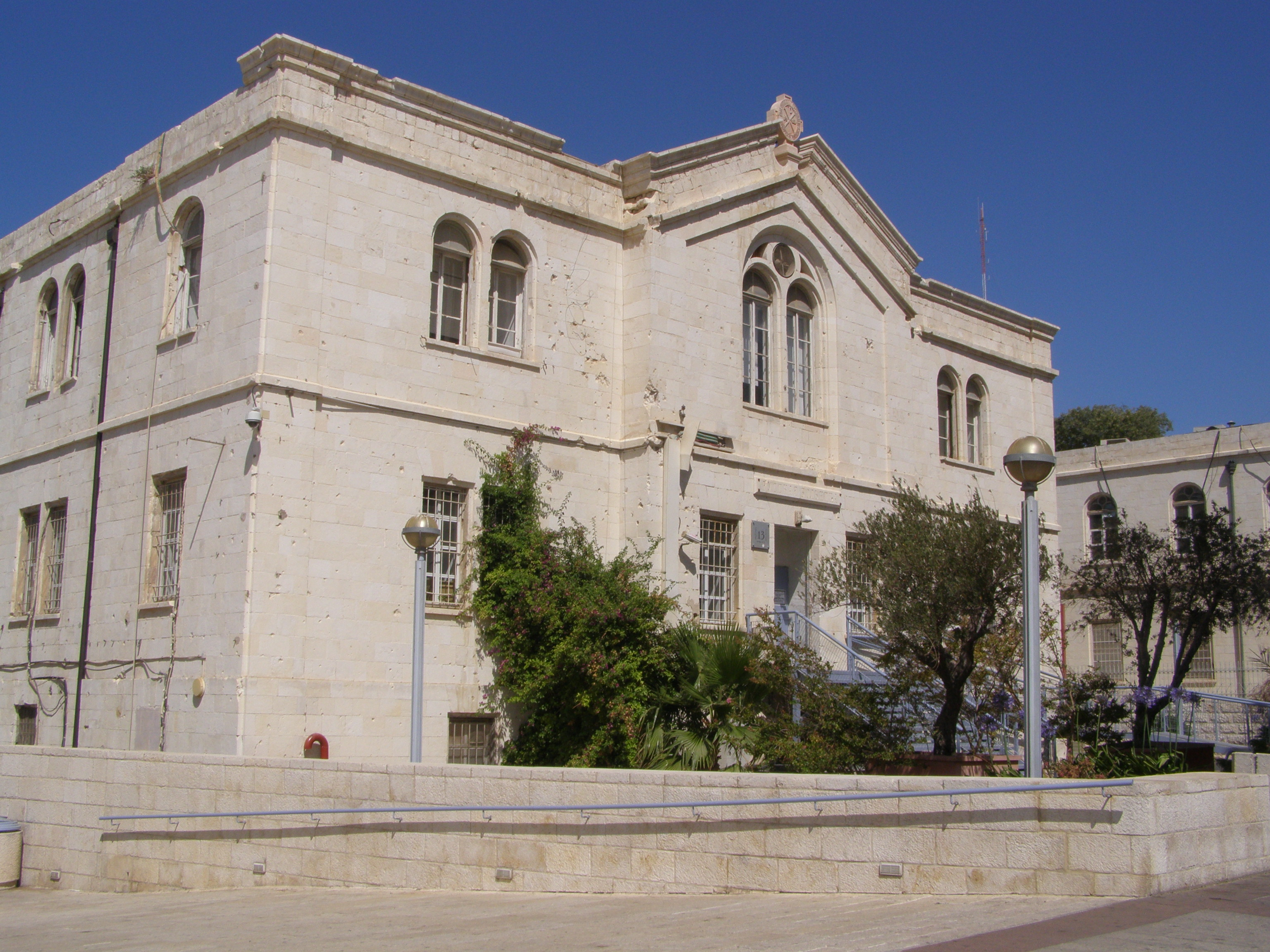
The old Russian hospital, one of the landmark buildings incorporated in the complex

The steps leading up to the complex from Jaffa Road are lined with 48 palm trees, hence the name Palm Plaza (Hebrew: רחבת דקלים). Several statues of lions, the symbol of Jerusalem, also adorn the square.

At the entrance of the complex stands the Daniel Garden, named for Jerusalem mayor Daniel Auster (in office 1937–38). The garden contains several works of art: a sculpture based on a large, working Archimedes' screw that carries water up from a small pool, titled "Modern Head"; a sculpture by Roy Lichtenstein donated in memory of assassinated prime minister Yitzhak Rabin; and "The Binding of Isaac" by Jerusalem sculptor Avraham Ofek.

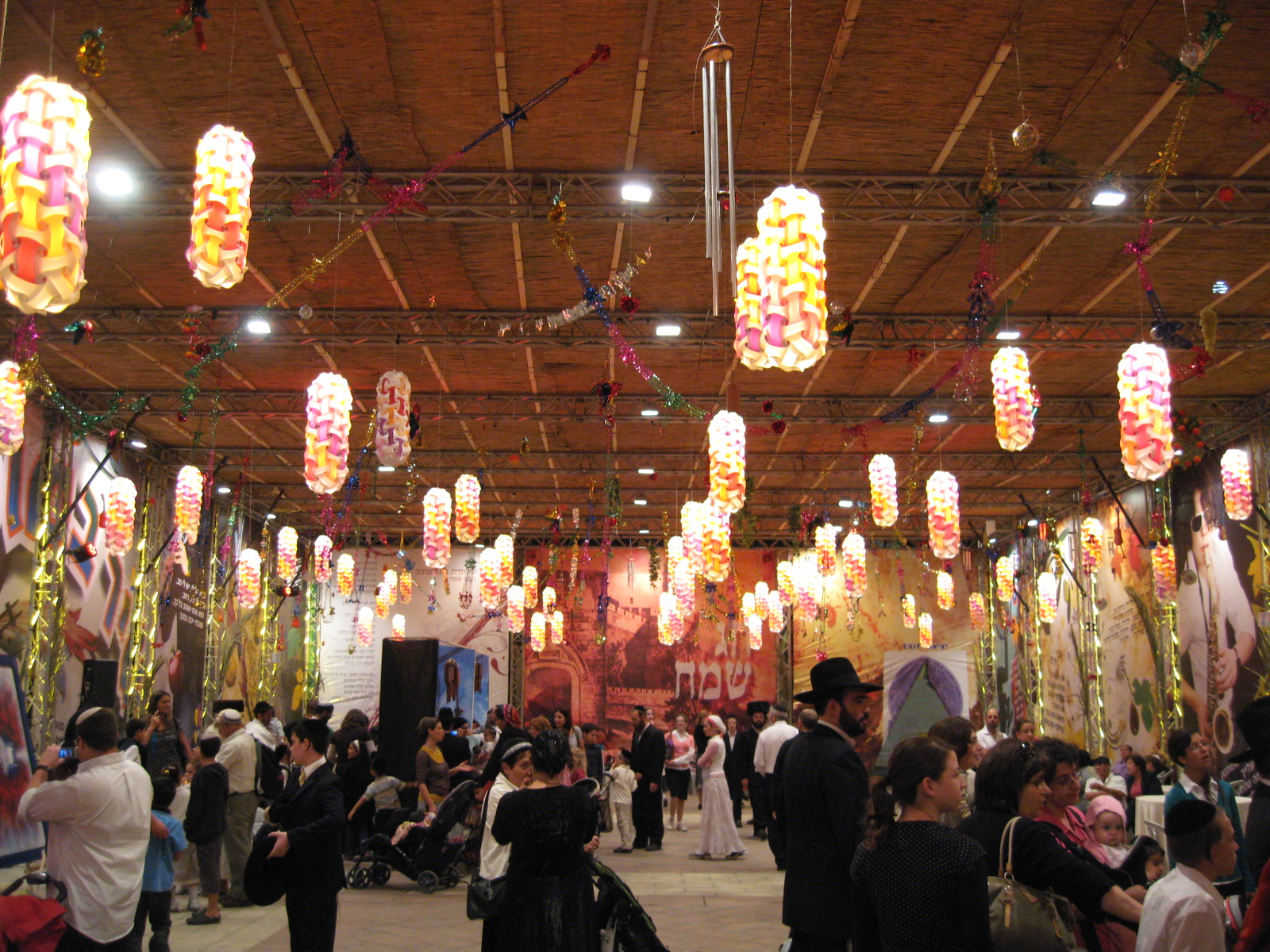
Public sukkah at Safra Square, 2009

In 2007 Safra Square hosted an exhibition of the United Buddy Bears, 138 two-metre tall bear sculptures, each designed by a different artist.

== See also ==
- List of mayors of Jerusalem
- Jerusalem Municipality, the buildings housing the municipal administration
- Jerusalem Old Town Hall (1930–1993)
