= Allon =

Allon (a Hebrew language word meaning "oak tree") may refer to:

- Allon (surname)
- Allon, Georgia, a ghost town
- Allon Road, named after Yigal Allon
- Allon (village), an Israeli settlement east of Jerusalem, also named after Yigal Allon
- Allon, the son of Jedaiah, of the family of the Simeonites, in the Bible
- Gim Allon, a superhero

== See also ==
- Aloni (disambiguation)
- Elon (disambiguation)
