= Ilana =

- Pronunciation: ee-lah-nah, i-lah-nah
- Gender: Female

Origin
- Origin: Hebrew
- Meaning: "tree"

Ilana is a feminine given name from Hebrew. In Hebrew, it is the female form of the word ilan (אִילָן), meaning "tree", or of the masculine name Ilan.

Notable people with the name include:

- Ilana Adir (born 1941), Israeli Olympic sprinter
- Ilana Avital (born 1960), Israeli singer
- Ilana Krausman Ben-Amos (born 1949), Israeli professor
- Ilana Berger (born 1965), Israeli tennis player
- Ilana Casoy (born 1960), Brazilian writer
- Ilana Cicurel (born 1972), French lawyer and politician
- Ilana Cohen (born 1943), Israeli politician
- Ilana Davidson, American operatic soprano
- Ilana Dayan (born 1964), Israeli journalist
- Ilana Duff, Canadian Paralympic athlete
- Ilana Eliya (born 1955), Israeli singer
- Ilana Frank, Canadian film producer
- Ilana Glazer (born 1987), American comedian and actress
- Ilana Halperin (born 1973), American artist
- Ilana Harris-Babou (born 1991), American sculptor
- Ilana Karaszyk (born 1938), Israeli Olympic runner and long jumper
- Ilana Kloss (born 1956), South African tennis player, World #1 in doubles
- Ilana Kratysh (born 1990), Israeli freestyle wrestler
- Ilana Kurshan, Israeli author
- Ilana Levine (born 1963), American actress
- Ilana Löwy (born 1948), Polish-Israeli-French historian
- Ilana Masad, Israeli American writer
- Ilana Mushin, Australian linguist
- Ilana Neumann, Dominican Republic politician
- Ilana Panich-Linsman (born 1984), American journalist
- Ilana Paul-Binyamin, Israeli academic
- Ilana Salama Ortar (born 1949), Israeli visual artist
- Ilana Raviv (born 1945), Israeli artist
- Ilana Rooderkerk (born 1987), Dutch actor and politician
- Ilana Rovina (1934–2020), Israeli singer
- Ilana Rovner (born 1938), American judge
- Ilana Rubel (born 1972), American politician
- Ilana Sod (born 1973), Mexican television presenter
- Ilana Verdansky, fictional character on the ABC television show Lost
- Ilana Vered (born 1943), Israeli pianist
- Ilana B. Witten, American neuroscientist
- Ilana Yahav, Israeli artist
