= Elon =

Elon may refer to:

== People ==
- Elon (name), a given name and surname
  - Elon Musk (born 1971), business magnate

== Places in the United States ==
- Elon, Iowa, an unincorporated community
- Elon, North Carolina, a town
- Elon, Virginia, an unincorporated community

== Other uses ==
- Elon University, in Elon, North Carolina
  - Elon Phoenix, the school's athletic program
- Elon (chemical), Eastman Kodak's trade name for p-methylaminophenol sulfate
- Elon the Muskox, a living sculpture at City Hall in Yellowknife, Northwest Territories, Canada
- Echelon Corporation (NASDAQ code: ELON)
- The "Elon", a fictional leader of a Mars colony in the 1953 book Project Mars: A Technical Tale by German-American rocket engineer Werner von Braun

== See also ==
- Alon (disambiguation)
- Allon (disambiguation)
- Aloni, a surname
- Eilon, Israel
