= Alon =

Alon or ALON may refer to:

- Alon (name), an Israeli given name and surname
- Alon (Israeli settlement), an Israeli settlement in the West Bank
- Alon Inc, an American airplane builder, known for the Alon A-4
- Alon USA, an American energy company
- Aluminium oxynitride (AlON), known under the trade name ALON

== See also ==
- Elon (disambiguation)
- Aloni (disambiguation)
- Aion (disambiguation)
