= Ilan (name) =

- Gender: Male

Origin
- Origin: Hebrew
- Meaning: Tree
- Region of origin: Israel

Other names
- Related names: Alon, Elon

Ilan (אילן in Hebrew) is an Israeli masculine given name and a surname which means "tree" in the Hebrew language.

Variants of the name include Alon and Elon. Notable people with the name include:

== Given name ==
- Ilan Averbuch (born 1953), Israeli sculptor
- Ilan Bakhar (born 1975), Israeli football player
- Ilan Ben-Dov (businessman) (born 1957), Israeli businessman
- Ilan Berman (born 1975), American political scientist
- Ilan Chester (born 1952), Venezuelan singer
- Ilan Chet (born 1939), Israeli microbiologist, President of the Weizmann Institute of Science
- Ilan Davis, Professor of Cell Biology at the University of Oxford
- Ilan Eshkeri (born 1977), British composer
- Ilan Gilon (1956–2022), Israeli politician
- Ilan Goldfajn (born 1966), Brazilian-Israeli economist and President of the Central Bank of Brazil
- Ilan Halevi (1943–2013), Palestinian writer
- Ilan Hall (born 1982), American chef
- Ilan Kidron (born 1976), Australian musician
- Ilan Meyer (born 1956), American epidemiologist
- Ilan Mitchell-Smith (born 1969), American actor
- Ilan Moskovitch (born 1966), Israeli filmmaker
- Ilan Pappé (born 1954), Israeli historian
- Ilan Ramon (1954–2003), Israeli pilot and astronaut
- Ilan Rechtman (born 1963), Israeli musician
- Ilan Rubin (born 1988), American drummer
- Ilan Shalgi (born 1945), Israeli politician
- Ilan Shiloah (born 1957), Israeli businessman
- Ilan Shohat (born 1974), Israeli politician
- Ilan Shor (born 1987), Moldovan hideaway businessman and politician.
- Ilan Stavans (born 1961) Mexican writer
- Ilan Virtzberg, Israeli composer, arranger, music producer, guitarist, and singer
- Ilan Volkov (born 1976), Israeli conductor

== Surname ==
- Eli Ilan (1928–1982), Israeli sculptor
- Tal Ilan (born 1956), Israeli historian
- Tova Ilan (1929–2019), Israeli educator
- Uri Ilan (1935–1955), Israeli soldier

== See also ==
- Alon (name)
- Bar-Ilan (disambiguation)
- Elon (name)
- Ilana
- Ilanit (name)
