= Alemeth =

Hebrew Biblical name of multiple uses

In the Hebrew Bible, Alemeth was:

- One of the nine sons of Becher, the son of Benjamin (1 Chronicles 7:8).
- One of the sons of Jehoadah, or Jarah, son of Ahaz (1 Chronicles 8:36).
- A sacerdotal city of Benjamin (1 Chronicles 6:60), called also Almon (Joshua 21:18), now Almit, a mile north-east of the ancient Anathoth.

The word alemeth means covering.
