= Ein Prat: the Academy for Leadership =

Leadership academy in Kfar Adumim, West Bank, Israel

- עין פרת - המדרשה למנהיגות חברתית
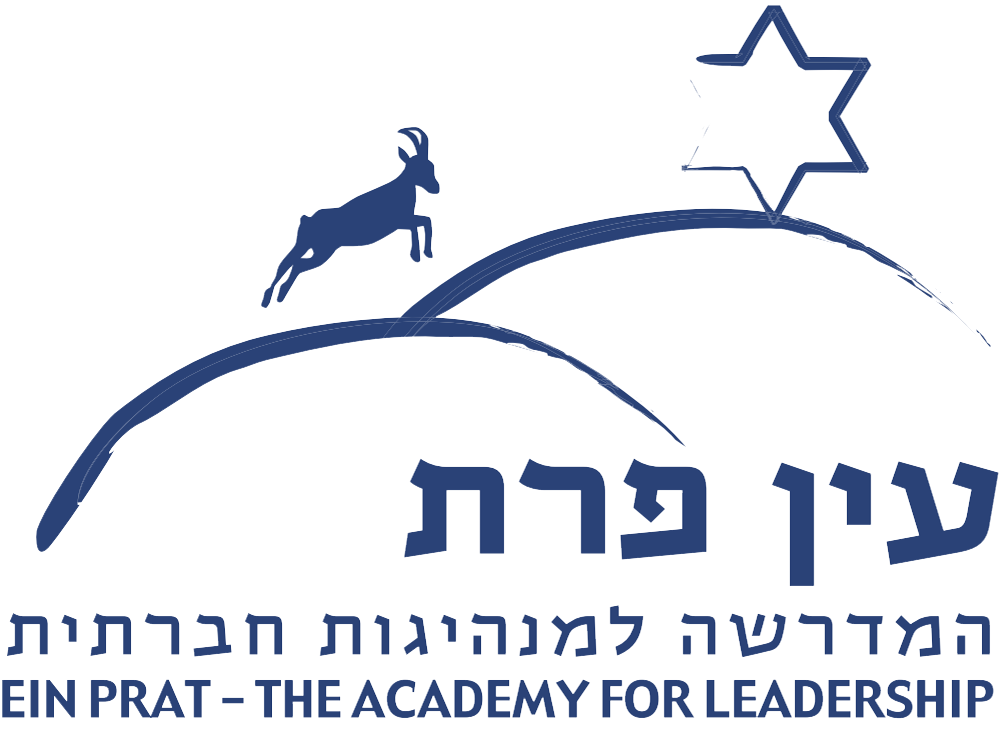

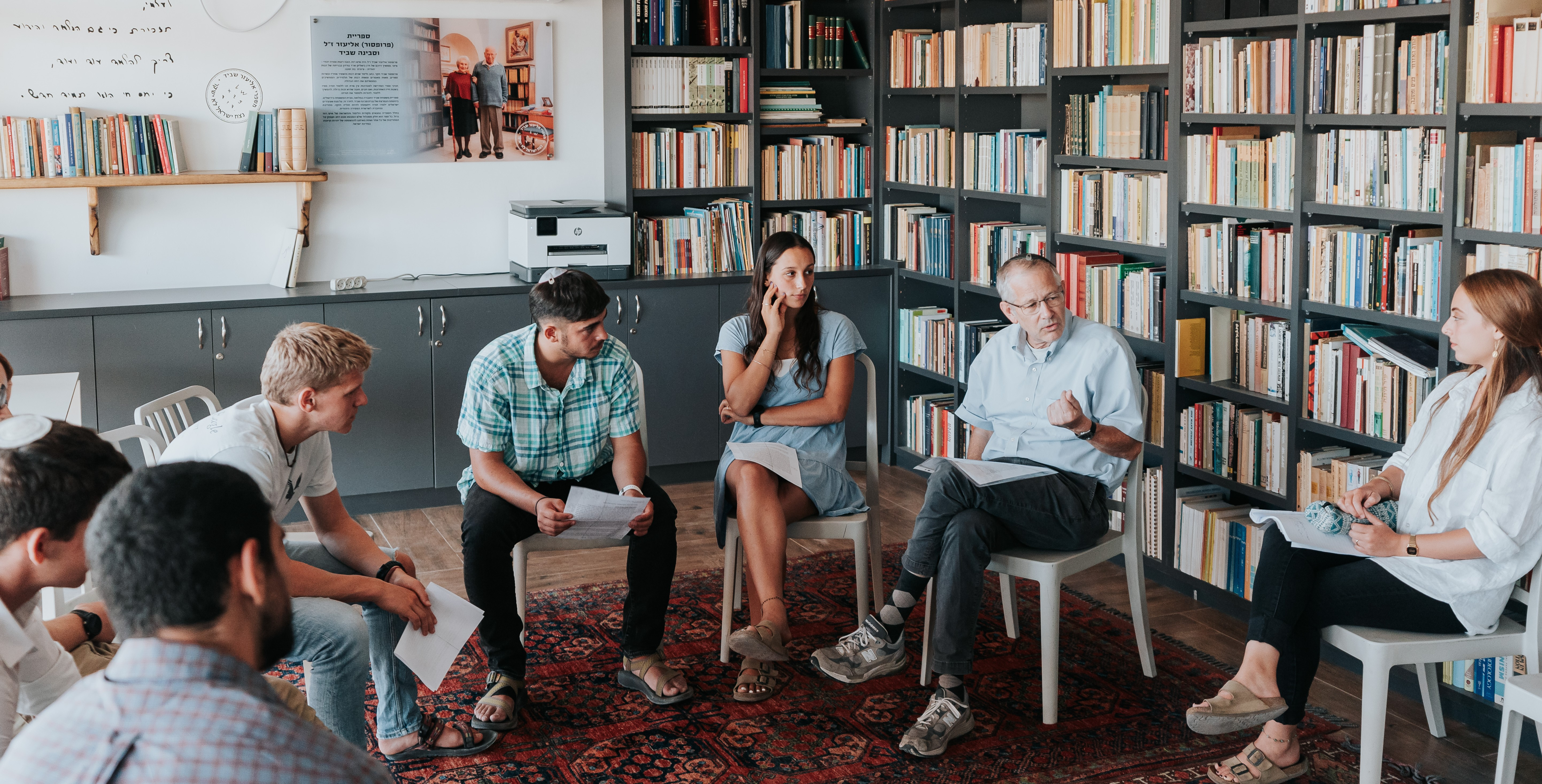

Information
- Established: 2001

Ein Prat: The Academy for Leadership (Hebrew: עין פרת - המדרשה למנהיגות חברתית) is a pre-military leadership academy for Israeli high school graduates in Kfar Adumim, a mixed religious-secular Israeli settlement in the West Bank.

Ein Prat was established in 2001 by Erez Eshel and members of the Kfar Adumim community. The academy runs three first-year mechinot in Kfar Adumim (2001), Nofei Prat (2016), and Kibbutz Sufa (2017), and one second year program (2003) in Kfar Adumim. In addition, Ein Prat opened the "Derech Prat" youth program for high school students in 2016.

== History ==
Ein Prat has over 800 graduates since 2001, and in 2017 has more than 350 students in multiple programs.

Founded as one organization in 2001, Ein Prat grew into two separate organizations: one based in Kfar Adumim for pre-military students and one based in Alon for post-military students. In 2016, the organizations formalized the split and the two organizations are now run by separate administrations.

On February 1, 2018, the Israeli Ministry of Defense recognized the mechina at Kibbutz Sufa, renaming it the "Hadar" Leadership Academy after slain Israeli soldier Hadar Goldin.

In August 2024, a group of American Microsoft employees launched a petition to delist the Academy, along with two other Israeli West Bank settlement charities, from the company's internal donation-matching service, Benevity. In its Benevity listing, the academy describes itself as a "volunteering organization who helps and support [sic] any one who got lost/wounded or any other problem in Judea desert area." The petition argued that "Microsoft is directly funding these illegal and immoral settlements by allowing these organizations to remain."

== Programs ==
- Kfar Adumim: a ten month pre-military leadership academy in the Judean desert.
- Nofei Prat: a ten month pre-military leadership academy in the Judean desert.
- Higher Academy: a second year program on the Kfar Adumim campus for graduates of a first year pre-military academy or year of shlichut.
- Kibbutz Sufa: a seven month pre-military leadership academy in the Negev desert.
- Derech Prat: a three year leadership program for sixteen to eighteen year old students.

== Curriculum ==
Ein Prat’s curriculum is founded on five core elements: (1) text study.(2) physical strength, (3) the land (4) volunteer work, and (5) group life. Throughout the different programs, students explore the connection between liberal, humanist, and Jewish values in classic texts. They participate in hikes.. They train for the Jerusalem marathon and study judo. Students volunteer at local schools and organizations, and live and work in independent groups within the academy

== Staff ==
- Founder, Erez Eshel
- CEO, Nimrod Palmach
- Head of the Academy, David Nachman

== Board of directors ==
- Herzl Makov (former Chair)
- Moshe Taubin (current Chair)
- Ilan Greenfield
- Yael Erlichman
- Boaz Ido
- Moris Zarfati
- Erez Eshel

== Organizations founded from Ein Prat ==
- Lev Echad
- Hashomer Hachadash
- Mechinat Tavor
- Mechinat Arava
