= Allon (surname) =

Allon is a Hebrew language surname, a variant of Alon, which means "oak tree". Notable people with the surname include:

- George Allon (1899–1983), British football player
- Henry Allon (1818–1892), British priest
- Henry Erskine Allon (1864–1897), British composer. Son of Henry Allon (1818–1892).
- Joe Allon (born 1966), British football player
- Tom Allon (born 1962), American newspaper publisher
- Yigal Allon (1918–1980), Israeli general and politician

== Fiction ==
- Gabriel Allon, fictional character in novels by Daniel Silva
- Gim Allon, fictional character in the DC Comics universe
- Yera Allon, fictional character in the DC Comics universe

== See also ==
- Allon (disambiguation)
