= Alon (name) =

- Gender: Male

Origin
- Origin: Hebrew
- Meaning: Oak tree

Other names
- Related names: Allon, Elon, Ilan

Alon (Hebrew: אַלּוֹן) is an Israeli surname and masculine given name, which means "oak tree" in the Hebrew language. Variants of the name include Allon, Elon and Ilan, which have their separate pages. The name may refer to:

== Given name ==
- Alon Abutbul (1965–2025), Israeli actor
- Alon Badat (born 1989), Israeli footballer
- Alon Bar (born 1966), Israeli filmmaker
- Alon Bement (1876–1954), American artist, arts administrator, author, and educator
- Alon Ben David (born 1967), Israeli journalist
- Alon Ben-Meir (born 1937), American writer
- Alon Carmeli (born 1964), Israeli businessman
- Alon Chen (born 1970), Israeli neuroscientist; 11th President of the Weizmann Institute of Science
- Alon Davidi (born 1973), Israeli politician
- Alon Day (born 1991), Israeli racing driver
- Alon De Loco (born 1974), Israeli musician
- Alon Eizenman (born 1979), Israeli ice hockey player
- Alon Harazi (born 1971), Israeli football player
- Alon Harel (born 1974), Israeli legal scholar
- Alon Hazan (born 1967), Israeli football player and coach
- Alon Hilu (born 1972), Israeli novelist
- Alon Leichman (born 1989), Israeli Olympian, member of the Israel national baseball team, and assistant pitching coach for the Cincinnati Reds
- Alon Mandel (born 1988), Israeli swimmer
- Alon Mizrahi (born 1971), Israeli football player
- Alon Nisim Cohen (born 1968), Israeli inventor, entrepreneur, and novelist
- Alon Pinkas (born 1961), Israeli diplomat
- Alon Stein (born 1978), Israeli basketball player
- Alon Tal (born 1960), Israeli environmentalist and politician
- Alon Turgeman (born 1978), Israeli basketball player and coach
- Alon Wieland (1935–2022), American businessman and politician
- Alon Yefet (born 1972), Israeli football referee

== Surname ==
- Azaria Alon (1918–2014), Israeli environmentalist
- Dan Alon (1945–2018), Israeli fencer
- Gedaliah Alon (1901–1950), Israeli historian
- Geva Alon (born 1979), Israeli musician
- Modi Alon (1921–1948), Israeli fighter pilot
- Nir Alon (born 1964), Israeli sculptor
- Nitzan Alon (born 1964), Israeli general
- Noga Alon (born 1956), Israeli mathematician
- Roy Alon (1942–2006), British stuntman
- Uri Alon (born 1969), Israeli scientist
- Yosef Alon (1929–1973), Israeli diplomat

See also: Alon family, a genealogical tree in Hebrew Wikipedia

== See also ==
- Alon (disambiguation)
- Allon (surname)
- Allon Bachuth
- Elon (name)
- Ilan (name)
