= Almon (Israeli settlement) =

Israeli settlement in the West Bank

Almon: עַלְמוֹן (Hebrew)
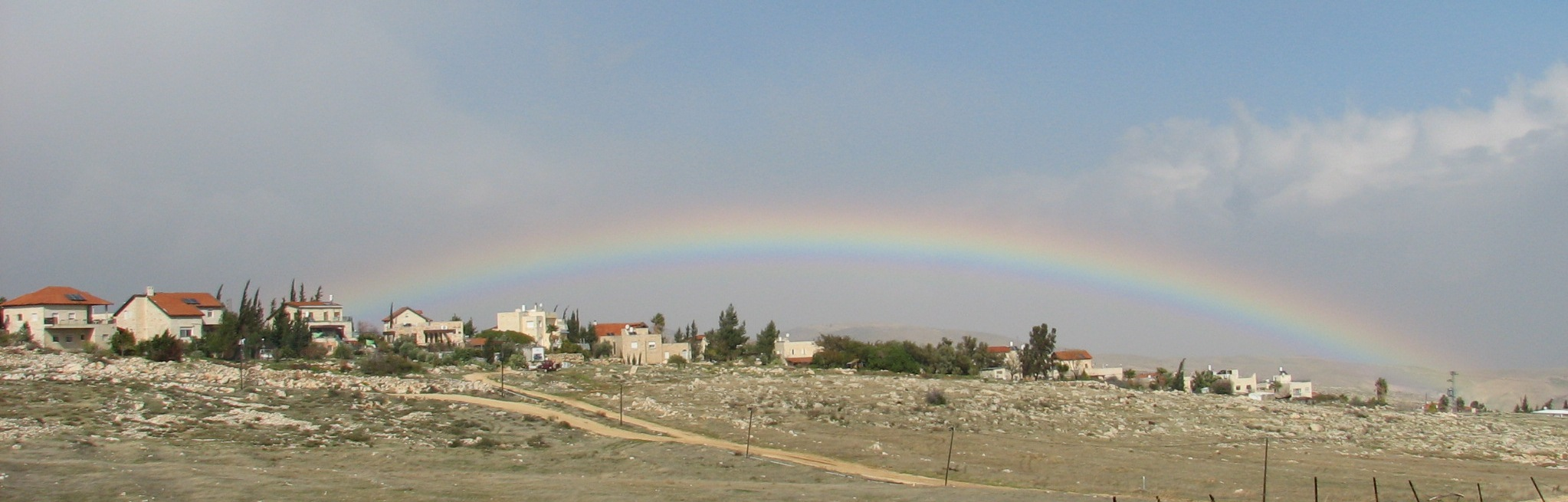

- Location within the Central West Bank Location within the West Bank Location within State of Palestine
- Coordinates: 31°49′54″N 35°17′43″E
- Country: Palestine
- District: Judea and Samaria Area
- Council: Mateh Binyamin
- Region: West Bank
- Affiliation: Amana
- Founded: 1982
- Population (2024): 1,474

Almon (Hebrew: עַלְמוֹן), also known as Anatot (Hebrew: עֲנָתוֹת), is an Israeli settlement in the West Bank, organized as a community settlement. Founded in 1982, it falls under the jurisdiction of the Mateh Binyamin Regional Council. In 2024 it had a population of 1,474.

The international community considers Israeli settlements in the West Bank illegal under international law, but the Israeli government disputes this.

== History ==
According to ARIJ, Almon is located on 783 dunams of land which Israel confiscated from the Palestinian town of 'Anata.

Anatot was established in 1982 by secular families with the help of the Amana organisation. It was named Anatot after the Kohanic city of Anathoth mentioned in the Book of Jeremiah 1:1. The later name Almon has its origins in the Bible (Joshua 21:18, here mentioned together with Anatot). The original biblical site of Almon is believed to lay on the adjacent mountain, southwest of Almon, in what is called Khirbet Almit, based on the testimony of a Jewish pilgrim to the region in 1850.

Until 1990, Anatot was the site of an Israel Defense Forces (IDF) detention center. It was closed on February 7, 1990, after the Association for Civil Rights in Israel petitioned the High Court of Justice to shut down the jail because of inhumane conditions there. The IDF closed the facility voluntarily before the High Court could rule on the petition.

== Land disputes ==
According to one Ta'ayush source, the settlement is built on the property of an Israeli Arab citizen, Abu Salah al Rifai. Anatot settlers claim that they have been subject to harassment by activists, while Ta'ayush members and other activists claim they suffered attacks by large numbers of settlers from the township while trying to assist a local Palestinian in protecting his property.

Anatot is the site of one of many quarries operated by Israeli companies in the West Bank. Yesh Din legal counsel Michael Sfard said that "according to international law, so long as the West Bank is not annexed to Israel, it is forbidden for Israel to exploit the natural resources there for non-security related purposes." Sfard also stated that 74% of the gravel mined from these quarries is used for construction inside Israel, and that that means the existence of the quarries violates international law.

The Israeli Supreme Court ruled that Israeli quarries in the West Bank are legal.

== Geography ==
Almon is located on a hill near the ruins of the Hariton Monastery and the Prat Stream, between Jerusalem, (Pisgat Ze'ev), and Ma'ale Adumim/Kfar Adumim. It is close to the Palestinian villages 'Anata and Hizma.

== Transport ==
Almon is connected to Jerusalem and Highway 1 via Road 437. Buses are the only form of public transport available, entering the village eleven times per workday.

Anatot was one of a number of settlements linked by a road secretly built by settlers in 1995. The road links Anatot to Kfar Adumim, Nofei Prat, and Alon. According to Pinhas Wallerstein, then head of the Mateh Binyamin Regional Council, the road was one of a number under clandestine construction in the area. Wallerstein claimed that as council head, he did not need permission to construct roads, but that he would stop construction if the Israel Defense Forces told him to. He also said "What are they going to do, tell us to take the road away? If the road is illegal let them take us to court."

== Legal status ==
The international community considers Israeli settlements to violate the Fourth Geneva Convention's prohibition on the transfer of an occupying power's civilian population into occupied territory. Israel disputes that the Fourth Geneva Convention applies to the Palestinian territories as they had not been legally held by a sovereign prior to Israel taking control of them. This view has been rejected by the International Court of Justice and the International Committee of the Red Cross.

== In popular culture ==
The 1988 HBO movie Steal the Sky, starring Mariel Hemingway and Ben Cross, was partially filmed in Anatot, which was used as a location substitute for Iraq. The producer bought war insurance which covered the production for up to $2 million in case the production was disrupted by the Arab-Israeli conflict.
