= Killing of Abir Aramin =

Palestinian victim of Israeli–Palestinian conflict

Abir Aramin عبير عرامين
- Born: 1997
- Died: 18 January 2007 (aged 10) 'Anata, Jerusalem Governorate, Palestinian territories
- Cause of death: Rubber bullet shot by Israel Defense Forces

Abir Aramin (Arabic: عبير عرامين, 1997–2007) was a Palestinian girl who was shot and killed by the Israel Defense Forces (IDF) in January 2007. Her death gained attention because her father, Bassam Aramin, had been a Fatah militant that subsequently embraced a peaceful resolution to the Israeli–Palestinian conflict through Combatants for Peace.

== Life ==
Aramin was born in 1997 and went to school in 'Anata, north of Jerusalem.

== Shooting ==
On January 16, 2007, Aramin left school with her sister and some friends. On their way home, she stopped at a candy store. While there, a group of Israeli border officers drove onto the street, attracting the attention of a group of youths, who began throwing rocks at them. During this altercation, one of the border officers fired their gun, hitting Aramin in the head with a rubber bullet; she had not been involved in the rock-throwing. According to witnesses, Aramin collapsed, bleeding profusely from the wound. She was rushed to the Hadassah Medical Center, where she underwent surgery for several hours. Aramin succumbed to her injuries within two days.

In the wake of Aramin's death, the Israeli authorities alleged that Aramin had died after being hit by a stone. The authorities closed the investigation in the same year.

== Aftermath ==
In the wake of Aramin's death, her father, Bassam Aramin, wrote an article in The Palestine Chronicle, emphasizing his commitment to nonviolence and criticizing the IDF's reaction to her death. Bassam brought a civil case, seeking compensation from the Israeli government. The Israeli government refused to order a criminal investigation in February 2008.

In 2010, Jerusalem District Court Judge Orit Efaal-Gabay determined that Israel was liable for Aramin's death.

On July 10, 2011, the Israeli High Court of Justice ruled that two officers suspected of killing Aramin would not stand trial. In September of the same year, Aramin's family was awarded $430,000 in compensation.
