= Khirbet Almit =

Archaeological site in the Jerusalem Governorate

- חורבת עלמית (Hebrew)
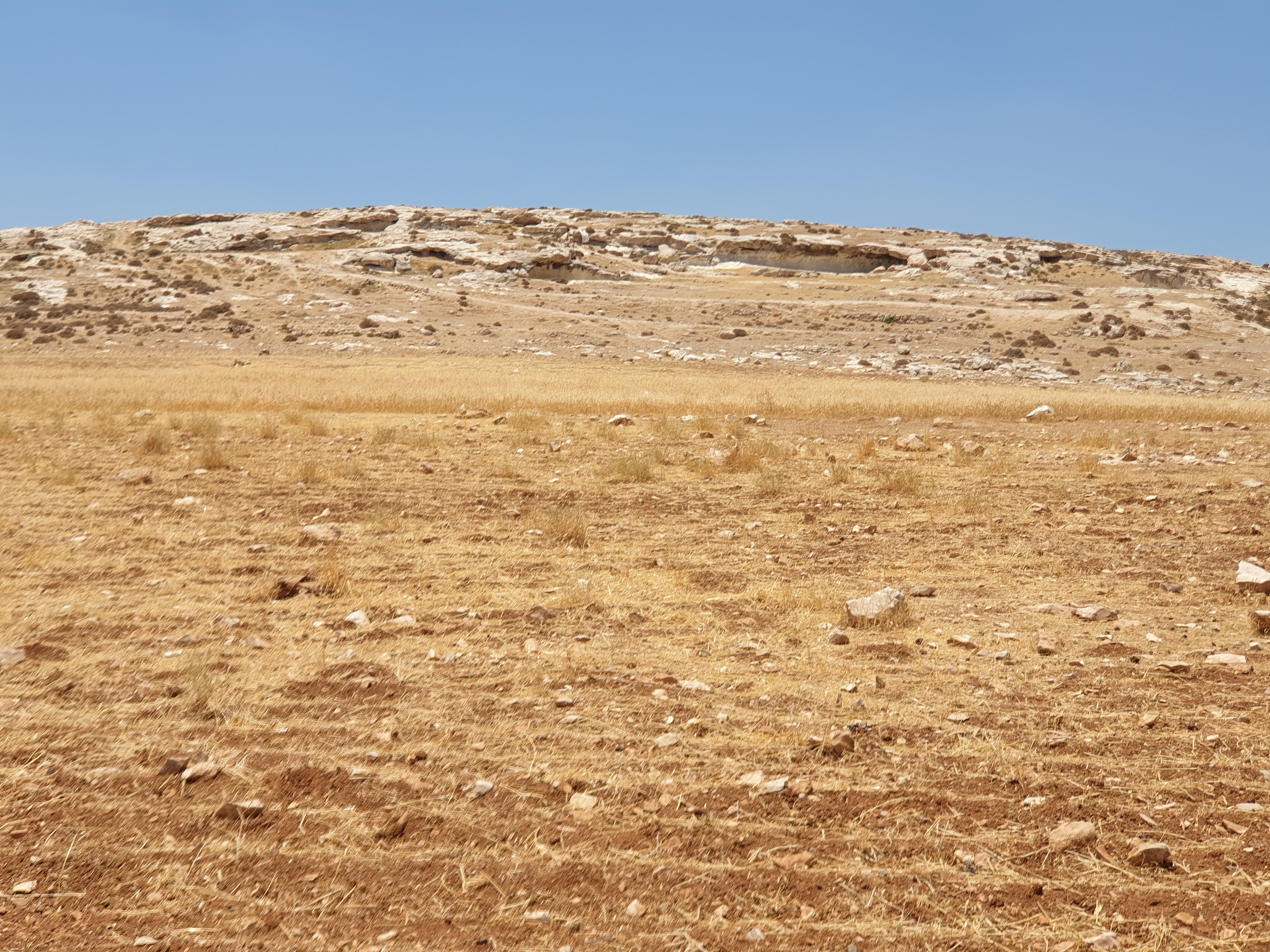
- Interactive map of Khirbet Almit
- 31°49′25.5″N 35°16′28.4″E
- Type: Settlement
- Periods: Bronze age - Ottoman period
- Cultures: Jewish, Muslim
- Location: West Bank
- Region: Jerusalem Governorate
- Part of: Bronze Age, Iron Age, Hellenistic period, Roman period, Byzantine period,

Site notes
- Height: 683 m (2,241 ft)
- Area: 2 ha (4.9 acres)
- Condition: Ruined
- Owner: Public
- Public access: Yes

Khirbet Almit is an archaeological site in the West Bank, occupied from the Middle Bronze Age to the Ottoman period. It is located in the Judaean Desert about 4 km northeast of Mount Scopus and about 1.5 km northeast of 'Anata. The site is situated on the top of two peaks of one hill at an altitude of 638 meters above sea level, near Nahal Zimri and on the border of the Nahal Prat Nature Reserve.

== Excavation history ==
The site of Khirbet Almit has been excavated several times. Rescue excavations were conducted in the years 1973, 1981, and 1999, in various areas in the site.

== Archeology ==
The center of the site is on the southwestern peak, where there are remains of buildings, a hiding complex dating to the Bar Kokhba Revolt, residential and storage caves, rock-cut tombs and additional graves, water cisterns, and terraces. Excavations has also found Yehud coins.

Apart from the excavated caves, the surveyors noted a burial cave on the western slope with five steps at its entrance. Inside the cave, there is a small hall with a small burial chamber, which includes four niches. Near the burial cave, there is a columbarium cave with about 70 niches. In the northwestern part of the peak, two water cisterns are carved into the chalk rock. To the south of them are the remains of a winepress, including a treading floor, a collection pit, and a section of mosaic.

At the top of the peak is a square structure with 4 meters long walls. In the northeastern part at the top of the peak, there is an industrial underground complex that had several agricaltural uses, including an oil press.

To the south of the southwestern peak is the tomb of Sheikh 'Abd es-Sallam, a Muslim saint who migrated from Morocco and founded the village of 'Anata. Next to this tomb are modern Arab graves.
