= Bar-Ilan (disambiguation) =

Bar-Ilan University is a public research university in Ramat Gan, Tel Aviv District, Israel.

Bar-Ilan may also refer to:

- David Bar-Ilan (1930–2003), Israeli pianist, author and newspaper editor
- Judit Bar-Ilan (1958–2019), Israeli computer scientist
- Meir Bar-Ilan (1880–1949), Orthodox rabbi, author, and Religious Zionist activist
- Bar-Ilan Street, a street in Jerusalem
- A 2009 peace address by Benjamin Netanyahu

== See also ==
- Ilan (name)
