= Kfar Adumim =

Israeli settlement in the West Bank

Kfar Adumim: כְּפַר אֲדֻמִּים, כפר אדומים (Hebrew); كفار أدوميم (Arabic)
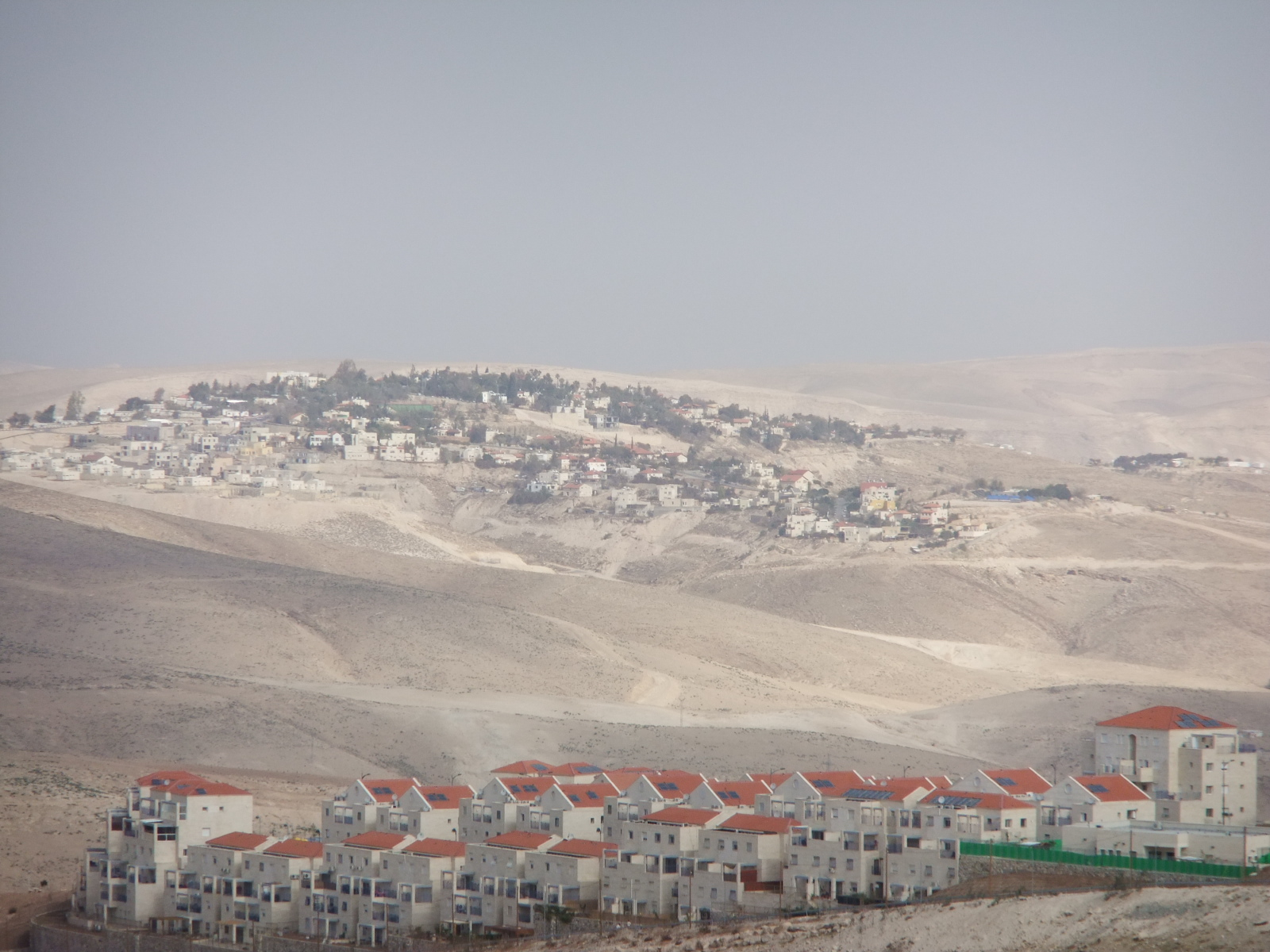
- Kfar Adumim taken from Ma'ale Adumim

- Location within the Central West Bank
- Coordinates: 31°49′26″N 35°20′6″E
- Country: Palestine
- District: Judea and Samaria Area
- Council: Mateh Binyamin
- Region: West Bank
- Founded: September 1979
- Population (2024): 5,206

Kfar Adumim (Hebrew: כְּפַר אֲדֻמִּים, lit. 'Village of The Red') is a mixed religious-secular Israeli settlement in the West Bank. It is located in the Judean Desert, on the southern bank of Wadi Qelt, about 2 miles northeast of the town Ma'ale Adumim. It is at 367 meters above sea level. It is organized as a community settlement and falls under the jurisdiction of Mateh Binyamin Regional Council. In 2024 it had a population of 5,206. The Israel Central Bureau of Statistics counts the populations of nearby settlements Alon and Nofei Prat as part of the population of Kfar Adumim.

The international community considers Israeli settlements in the West Bank illegal under international law, but the Israeli government disputes this.

== Etymology ==
The settlement name "Kfar Adumim" is taken from Joshua 15:7 and Joshua 18:17: It literally means "Village of The Red". It takes its name from the red rock lining the ascent from the Dead Sea.

== History ==
According to ARIJ, Kfar Adumim is located on 820 dunams of land which Israel confiscated from the Palestinian town of 'Anata.

Kfar Adumim was established in September 1979. Its first settlers were 10 families that had seceded previously from the group which founded Ma'ale Adumim and had been living in Mishor Adumim. The nearby settlements Alon (1 kilometer to the northeast of KA) and Nofei Prat (1 kilometer to the west of KA) were founded in 1990 and 1992, respectively. Statistically, the populations of Nofei Prat and of Alon are counted as part of Kfar Adumim's population, but these settlements are separate municipal entities. The tiny settlement Mitzpe Hagit was founded in 1999 on the opposite bank of Wadi Qelt by a family from Alon, and is considered to be a borough of Kfar Adumim.

A road was secretly built by the local settlers in 1995. The road joins Anatot to Kfar Adumim, Nofei Prat, and Alon. According to Pinhas Wallerstein, then head of the Mateh Binyamin Regional Council, the road was one of a number of secretly built roads under construction in the area. Wallerstein claimed that as council head, he did not need permission to construct roads, but that he would stop construction if the Israel Defense Forces told him to.

== Geography ==
Kfar Adumim lies on the southern bank of Wadi Qelt, locally known as Nahal Prat (Prat Brook), about 15 kilometers to the northeast of Jerusalem. It is located in the border region of the Judaean Desert, on a low ridge ranging in height between 200 and 450 meters above sea level. One of the 3 large springs of Wadi Qelt, Ein Fu'ar, or Ein Ma'bu'a, in Hebrew, is located near Alon. Nahal Michmash, Wadi Qelt's largest tributary, meets with Wadi Qelt about one kilometer to the north of Kfar Adumim. The road linking Jerusalem with the Dead Sea, Highway 1, passes to the south of Kfar Adumim, along a route similar to that of the ancient road that used to lead from Jerusalem to Jericho. Khan al-Ahmar is located between Kfar Adumim and Ma'ale Adumim.

Kfar Adumim has a small industrial zone located along the road leading from Highway 1 to the settlement. In it are some small businesses, garages, a metalwork shop, a couple of carpentries, a gas station and some light industry.

== Organisation ==
Kfar Adumim is a Community settlement. It holds the legal status of a cooperative association for settlement. Most of the local residents are members of the association. The association appoints its members for positions in its institutions via an election process in which all members participate. These institutions include various committees dealing with education, culture, construction etc. The topmost authority of the Kfar Adumim association is its general assembly in which all members participate, and the decisions of which are binding to all members.

The purpose of the settlement's founders was to create a mixed community where religious and secular families could coexist. Already in its early years the settlement had absorbed many Jewish repatriates from different countries, most of whom remained there as permanent residents. An absorption center for new repatriates and for regular applicants who wish to be accepted into the association still operates in Kfar Adumim. It owns 25 mobile homes (caravans) scattered around the settlement. Children of permanent residents may also apply for membership in the association.

In order to become members of the Kfar Adumim Association, a family needs to go through a lengthy acceptance process, at the end of which the general assembly votes on their acceptance to the association. Many singles and families rent apartments in Kfar Adumim and live there without being members .

== Education ==
As stipulated by the ideology of its founders, the children of Kfar Adumim go to a common school - the Experimental Religious State School of Kfar Adumim. Although this school belongs to the Israeli religious state school system it serves as a mixed school for religious and secular students alike, and is set to accommodate the needs of both. over 700 students attend the schools, from 1st to 12th grade. They come mostly from Kfar Adumim, Alon and Nofei Prat. Most high school students study in the local high school, while some travel to schools in Jerusalem, or in various Yeshivas around Israel.

The education system of Kfar Adumim also includes a nursery, for children over 2–3 months of age, and several kindergartens. The Ein Prat pre-military mechina is situated near Kfar Adumim, a couple hundred yards down the road leading from Kfar Adumim to Alon.

== Economy ==
The average per-capita income of the residents of Kfar Adumim is above the national average. Most residents of Kfar Adumim work in Jerusalem while some work in the settlement itself.

The occupations available locally are:

- Education: work at the local school and kindergarten.
- Local Administration and municipal services, including the local pool, post office and the local library.
- Small businesses like the local grocery store, health food store etc.
- Jobs available at the local industrial zone
- Agriculture: the settlement has an olive grove, a plot of Opuntia ficus-indica (its fruit is also known as Barbary Figs), a plant nursery and a horse farm.

== Voting Patterns ==
In the 2026 election, 50 percent of voters in Kfar Adumim voted for the parties of the right-wing coalition led by Benjamin Netanyahu, while 30 percent voted for the parties of the center-left coalition led by Gadi Eisenkot and 0.1 percent voted for the Arab parties. An additional 6.7 percent voted for the Reservists, and 11.9 percent voted for Amcha Yisrael. Voter turnout increased 22 percent from the 2022 election.

== Notable residents ==
- Sallai Meridor
- Aryeh Eldad (as of 2005)

== Gallery ==
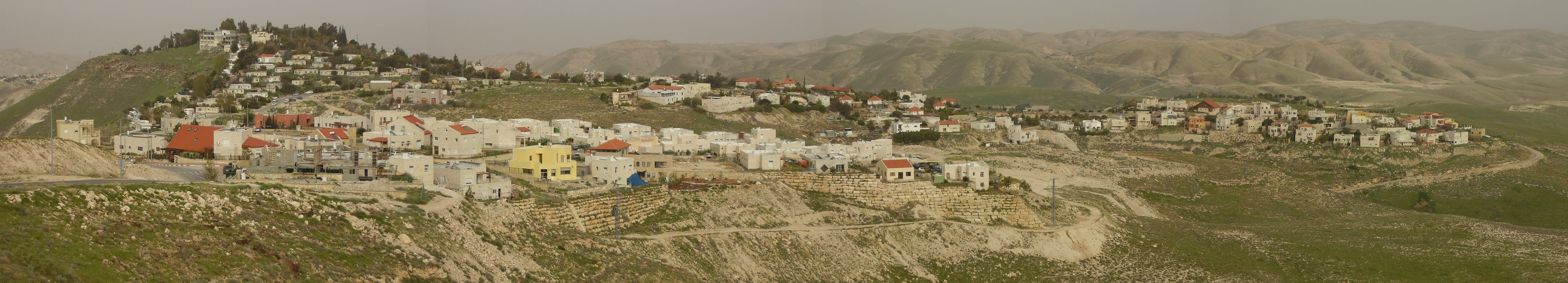
Kfar Adumim viewed from Nofei Prat.

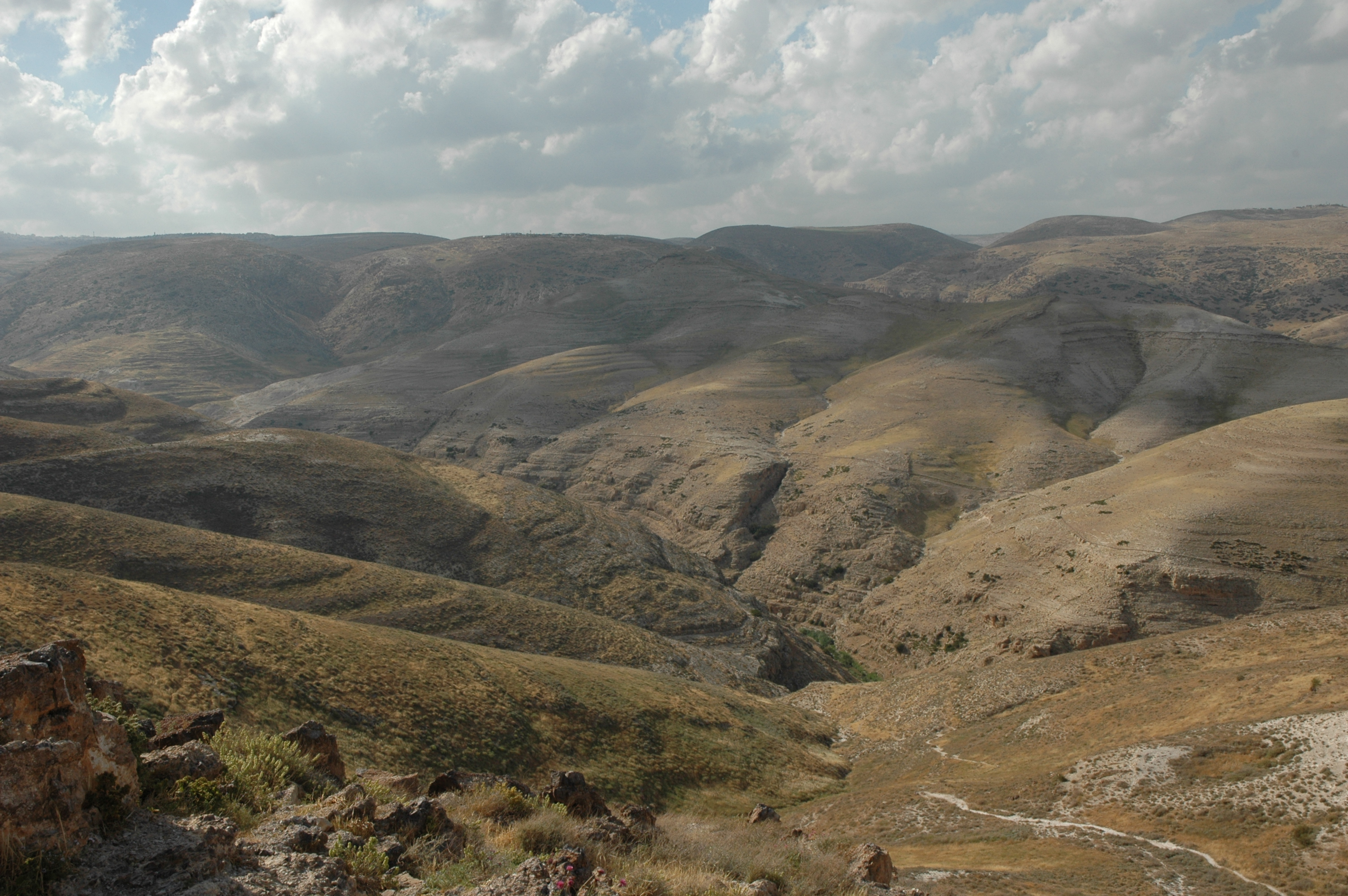
View of Wadi Qelt from Kfar Adumim
