= Ilana Salama Ortar =

Israeli artist

Ilana Salama Ortar (Hebrew: אילנה סלאמה אורתר; born 1949, Alexandria, Egypt) is an interdisciplinary visual artist whose work focuses on issues of migration, uprooting, exile and architecture of emergency.

== Life ==
Ilana Salama Ortar was born in Alexandria, Egypt, in 1949. Forced to leave Egypt with a one-way pass in 1952, Ortar and her parents migrated to Haifa in Israel. They transited via the camp Le Grand Arénas, near Marseilles in France. She studied Art History and French Literature at the Hebrew University in Jerusalem and graduated M.A. in 1986.

In 2008, she was awarded a PhD degree with her thesis "Civic Performance Art and Architecture of Emergency” at the University of Roehampton, London, UK.

== Career ==
From 1975 to 1988 she worked as curator of the Art Gallery, University of Haifa. From 1996 to 2011 she has been teaching at the School of Communication, Sapir Academic College in Sderot, the Tel Hai Academic College, and the Holon Institute of Technology. From 2008 to 2011 she was the Head of Visual Art in the Department of Visual Art, Literature and Music, Academic College, Safed.

Ortar won a fellowship at IMéRA, Aix-Marseilles in 2015. Ortar was awarded the Israeli Lottery Award for Visual Arts (2012/2014) and the Prize of the Ministry of Education in Israel for Visual Arts (2006).

== Work ==
=== Urban Traces (1985-present) ===
Urban Traces is a series of paintings, works on paper, and photography (photogram) that deal with the issue of erased memories in the urban fabric. The palimpsestic writing/painting of the canvas reflect the city's building and rebuilding, and the sedimentation process by which its successive identities are projected onto material and immaterial elements. Berlin Diary is her latest series.Urban Traces works have been exhibited in Israel (University of Haifa, Israel Museum, Tel Aviv Museum of Art, Artists’ House Jerusalem), France (Renos Xippas Gallery, Paris), United States (Marge Goldwater Gallery and Drawing Center Soho, New York City) and the Netherlands (Forum Gallery, Amsterdam).

=== Civic performance art (1995-present) ===
Civic Performance Art includes projects realized on site over periods of several months or years. It involves research, installation, drawing, painting, performance, experimental video, documentary filmmaking, and architectural model. Civic Performance Art examines the effects on individuals, communities, cities, and landscapes of situations of arbitrariness and domination. It exposes the State of Emergency that pervades all levels of people's experience when they are displaced physically (immigrants), socially (in rundown districts) or politically (by war and occupation).

Civic Performance Art engages such diverse fields as philosophy, history, anthropology, and political science along with media, cultural theory, memory, and trauma. It revolves around three key objectives: to make visible stories that were erased and activate them as site specific performance, to produce visual critical documentation, and to create spaces of dialogue between local communities.

The main projects of Civic Performance Art are:

- Villa Khury / The Prophets’ Tower, Haifa (1995-2001)
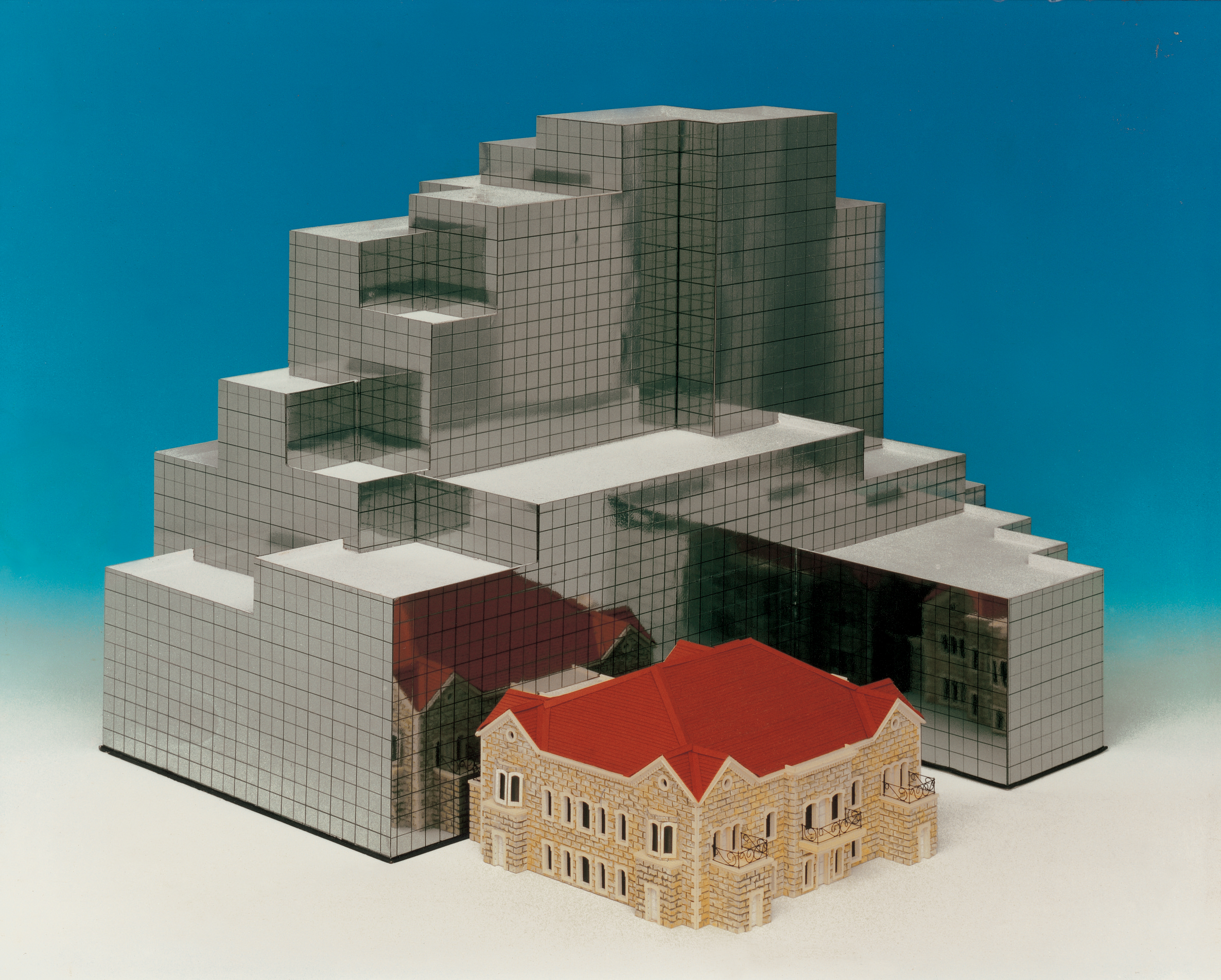
  Model of the Villa Khury and Prophets Tower used in the installation at the mall, 1995

The project focused on the Prophets’ Tower, a glass-and-steel mall built in 1979 in Wadi Nisnas at the very place of the Villa Khury, an emblematic site of Arab resistance during the 1948 Arab-Israeli war. It made visible memory layers of the city and brought the mixed population of Haifa to exchange around them. It was based on collecting testimonies via questionnaires and interviews, and creating installations and performances in downtown Haifa public spaces.

- The Camp of the Jews, Le Grand Arénas Transit Camp, Marseilles (1998-2013)
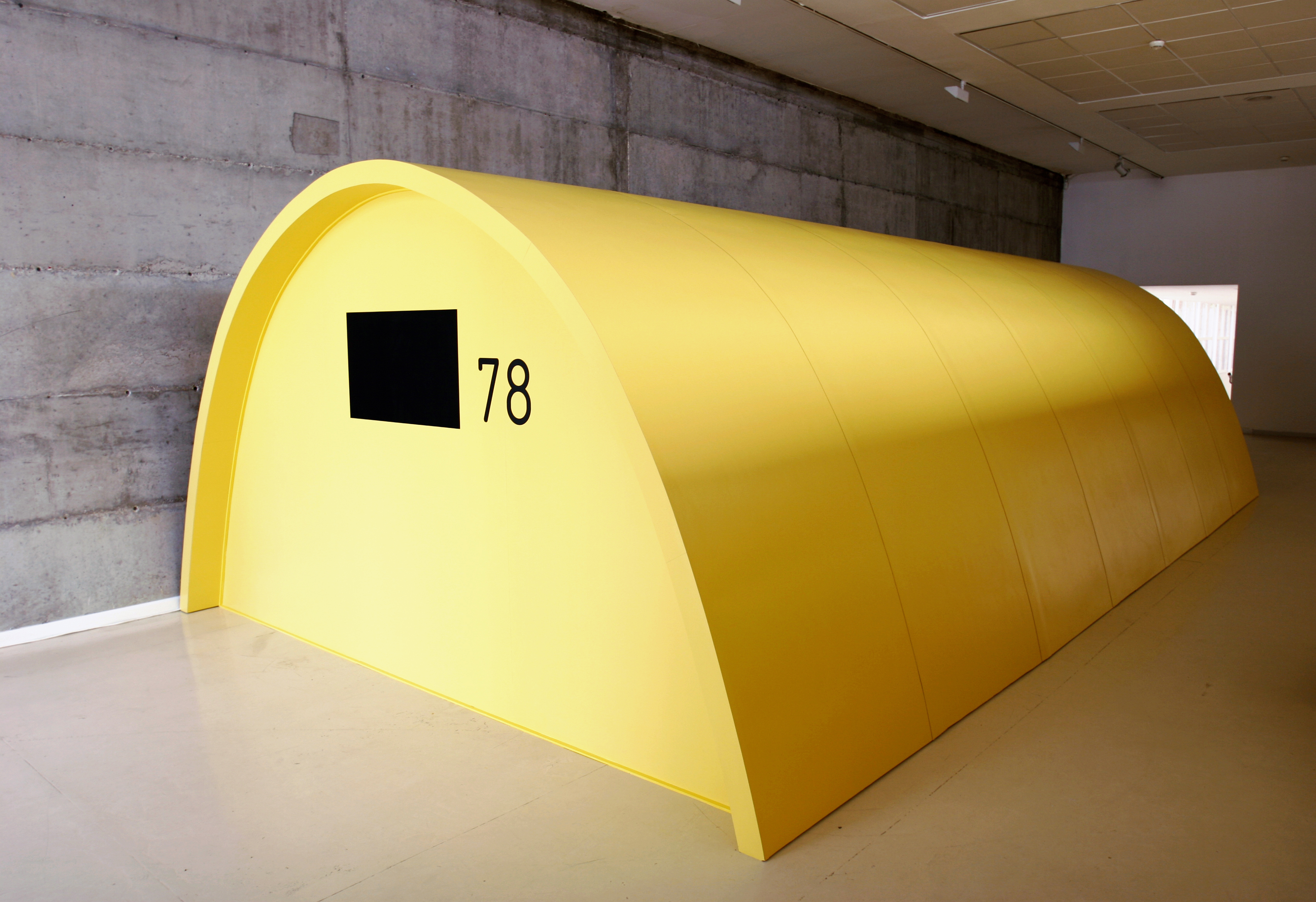
  Reconstruction of a barrack of Le Grand Arénas in the exhibition at Herzliya Museum, 2005

Through excavations conducted with the local population, architectural reconstruction, sound installation, mappings, drawings, and interviews, the different projects explored the history and architectural structure of the transit camp Le Grand Arénas.

The camp was built near Marseilles in 1945 by architect Fernand Pouillon for regulating postwar population movements. It served in the 1950s as transit camp for Jews from Arab countries and Holocaust survivors, and later on as settlement for Maghreb migrants and social outcasts until it was destroyed in the 1960s. Ilana Salama Ortar published the book The Camp of the Jews in 2005, with texts by Yona Fischer, Zvi Efrat and Sophie Wahnich.

- Adamot, Land without Earth and Corporeal-Memory (1989-2010)
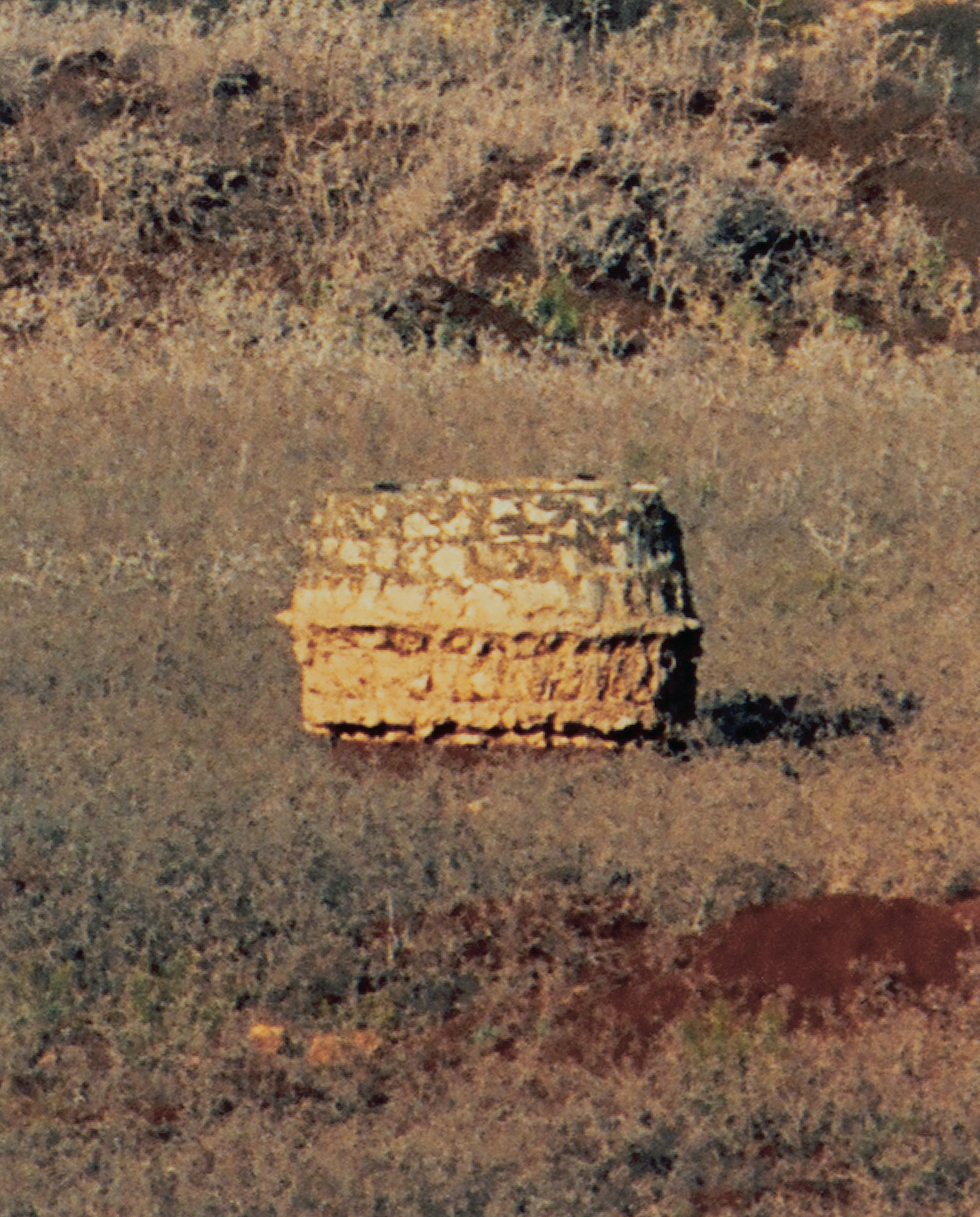
  Level stone: conceptual crossing of the border between Israel and South Lebanon, photo made in 2000

The work combined two projects dealing with the notion of bare life, drawn after Giorgio Agamben, and referring to the borders between Israel and Lebanon and Syria respectively. Land Without Earth focused on the unilateral transfer of fertile soil from an area under Israeli Defense Forces control in Southern Lebanon to Northern Israel in 1995–1998.

While realizing a documentary movie on the subject, Ortar came upon a young Druze man who had lost half his body in a landmine explosion when he was fourteen. He asked her to film him. The movie Corporeal Memory covers two time periods: the first is a journey into the past via a flashback to his childhood, the second focuses on his progress in the present. Both border areas described in the works were or are under Israeli control and experienced war. They subsist in a constant state of emergency, or State of exception.

=== Foreign Body (2015-present) ===
Foreign body is a multidisciplinary study of the bodies of aging migrant women in their host countries through bodily and spoken language. The project seeks to reflect different cultural, social, political, biological and ritual perspectives on the aging of migrant women. Salama Ortar is concerned with the notion of body socialization through two main fields of inquiry. First, she examines the "encoding" of the body through the language, new for the women, that is used in the set of institutions they have to deal with, for instance administrative, medical and juridical institutions. Second, she looks into the "narrative" of the body or the way the women represent and perform their body at the crossroads of their own culture and the culture of the host society. Foreign Body is an ongoing and multimedia project (photos, interviews, sound installations, objects, drawings, archive documents). The first phase was developed in the framework of a fellowship at IMéRA (Institut d'études avancées d'Aix-Marseille, Exploratoire Méditerranéen de l’Interdisciplinarité) in Marseilles in 2015. It was initially based on a series of workshops organized in partnership with the association AMPIL (the association provides social and health services for the elderly from the Mediterranean as well as social integration through housing).

== Film and video ==
- Foreign Body: Ima. Oum. Mère, 7 min.
- Laissez-Passer, 2013, 3 min.
- Foreseer of the Past, 2012, 4 min.
- Territorial Intimacy, 2010, 15 min.
- Tel Aviv-Berlin, 2009, 5 min.
- The Quiet Beach, 2007, 3 min.
- Arrêt Barre Chicago, Lyon, 2003, 60 min.
- The Camp of the Jews (Testimonies), 2003, 27 min.
- L’Incurable mémoire des corps, 2000, 10 min.
- Adamot, 2000, 12 min.
- Body Memory, 1999, 17 min.
- Urban Traces: Villa Khury / The Prophets’ Tower, 1995, 17 min.

== Collections ==
The work of Ilana Salama Ortar is included in the public collection of

- the Israel Museum in Jerusalem,
- the Haifa Museum of Modern Art,
- Tel Aviv Museum of Art,
- the Yad Vashem Museum,
- the Metropolitan Museum of Art in New York City,
- the Brooklyn Museum of Art,
- the Philadelphia Museum of Art,
- the Museum of Fine Arts in Houston,
- the Stedelijk Museum in Amsterdam,
- the FNAC (Fonds National d’Art Contemporain) in Paris,
- the FRAC (Fonds Régional d'Art Contemporain) Poitou-Charentes, and * the FRAC PACA (Provence-Alpes-Côte-d’Azur).
