= Ilan Davis =

Prof Ilan Davis
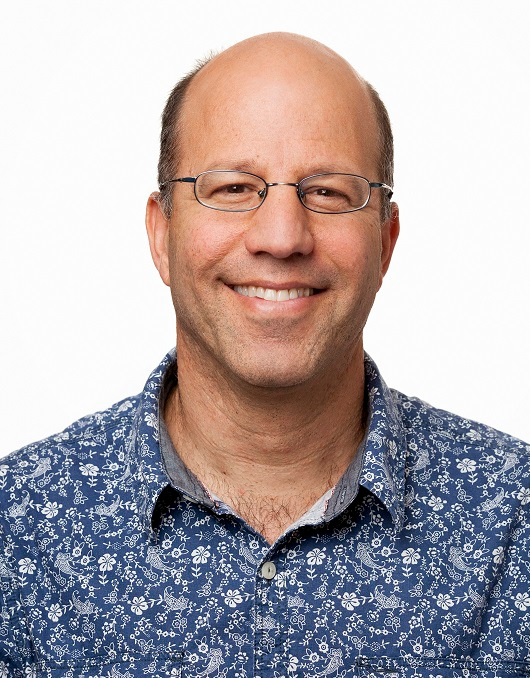
- Ilan Davis
- Born: 1964
- Known for: RNA localization, advanced imaging
- Awards: EMBO Member
- Scientific career
- Fields: Cell Biology, Advanced Imaging
- Institutions: Department of Biochemistry, University of Oxford
- Thesis: Intracellular message localisation in Drosophila melanogaster (1990)
- Doctoral advisor: David Ish-Horowicz
- Other academic advisors: Patrick H. O'Farrell
- Website: www.ilandavis.com

Professor Ilan Davis is a Professor of Spatial Molecular Biology (Molecular Biosciences), University of Glasgow. From 2007 to 2023 was a professor of Cell Biology and Wellcome Investigator at the Department of Biochemistry, University of Oxford. Previously (1996-2007) he was a Professor and Wellcome Trust Senior Fellow (2002-2007) at the Wellcome Trust Centre for Cell Biology, University of Edinburgh. In 2011, he was elected as an EMBO fellow.

== Education ==
Davis studied Natural Sciences (Genetics) at King’s College, Cambridge, earning a BA in 1986. He then went on to complete a DPhil in Developmental Biology in 1990 under the supervision of David Ish-Horowicz at the Department of Zoology at University of Oxford. Davis completed postdoctoral research from 1992 to 1995 at the Department of Biochemistry and Biophysics, UCSF, in Patrick H. O'Farrell’s laboratory, with a Nato SERC postdoctoral fellowship followed by a Boyer postdoctoral Fellowship.

== Research ==
His work focuses on the mechanism of mRNA transport and localised translation in the Drosophila nervous system.

Davis previously held, as the principal applicant, a Wellcome Career Development Fellowship, Lister Senior Fellowship (2000-2002), three Wellcome Trust Senior Research Fellowships (2002-2017), two Wellcome Trust Strategic Awards (2010-2021), MRC grant for Nanoscopy Oxford (2015-2020) and currently a Wellcome Investigator Award (2017-2023).

== Selected publications ==
- Gala, D. S., Titlow, J. S., Teodoro, R. O., & Davis, I. (2023). Far from home: the role of glial mRNA localization in synaptic plasticity. RNA, 29(2), 153-169.
- Titlow, J. S., Kiourlappou, M., Palanca, A., Lee, J. Y., Gala, D. S., Ennis, D., ... & Davis, I. (2022). Systematic analysis of YFP gene traps reveals common discordance between mRNA and protein across the nervous system. bioRxiv, 2022-03.
- Lee, J. Y., Wing, P. A., Gala, D. S., Noerenberg, M., Järvelin, A. I., Titlow, J., ... & Davis, I. (2022). Absolute quantitation of individual SARS-CoV-2 RNA molecules provides a new paradigm for infection dynamics and variant differences. Elife, 11, e74153.
- Gala, D. S., Lee, J. Y., Kiourlappou, M. S., Titlow, J. S., Teodoro, R. O., & Davis, I. (2022). Mammalian glial protrusion transcriptomes predict localization of Drosophila glial transcripts required for synaptic plasticity. bioRxiv, 2022-11.
- Wickenhagen, A., Sugrue, E., Lytras, S., Kuchi, S., Noerenberg, M., Turnbull, M. L., ... & Wilson, S. J. (2021). A prenylated dsRNA sensor protects against severe COVID-19. Science, 374(6567), eabj3624.
