= Gim Allon =

Character in the DC Comics universe

- Gim Allon as Leviathan, as depicted in Legionnaires #31 (November 1995). Art by Jeff Moy.

Publication information
- Publisher: DC Comics
- First appearance: Action Comics #267 (August 1960)
- Created by: Jerry Siegel; Jim Mooney

In-story information
- Alter ego: Gim Allon
- Species: Metahuman
- Place of origin: Earth (31st century)
- Team affiliations: Legion of Super-Heroes; Science Police
- Notable aliases: Leviathan; Micro Lad
- Abilities: (As Colossal Boy and Leviathan): Self-magnification; Superhuman strength and durability; (As Micro Lad): Size reduction; (All): Flight via ring

Gim Allon, also known as Colossal Boy, Leviathan, and Micro Lad, is a superhero appearing in books published by DC Comics, primarily as a member of the Legion of Super-Heroes in the 30th and 31st centuries. Created by writer Jerry Siegel and artist Jim Mooney, the character first appeared in Action Comics #267 (August 1960).

He has gone by a variety of superhero names over the past several decades, although Colossal Boy is the first and most common. After realizing that Gim Allon's surname Allon was of Israeli origin, writer Paul Levitz identified the character as Jewish in 1980.

In the 1990s, the entirety of the Legion of Super-Heroes were changed in what is referred to as a "reboot" of those characters' continuity, including Allon. Later on, these superheroes were again rebooted in what has been referred to as the "Threeboot".

== Fictional character biography ==
=== Original continuity ===
Gim Allon as Colossal Boy, in his Silver Age costume; art by Curt Swan and George Klein.

Gim Allon is an officer of the Science Police who was mutated by a radioactive meteorite, gaining the superhuman ability to increase his size. With his parents' blessing, he joins the Legion of Super-Heroes as Colossal Boy.

Gim has an unreciprocated crush on fellow Legionnaire Shrinking Violet. This crush is only returned when Violet is replaced by the Durlan imposter named Yera, who he ends up marrying. For a time, Colossal Boy's mother Marte Allon was the President of Earth.

During the "Five Year Gap" following the Magic Wars, Earth falls under the covert control of the Dominators and withdraws from the United Planets. A few years later, the members of the Dominators' Batch SW6 escape captivity. Initially assumed to be genetic clones of the Legionnaires, the SW6 Legionnaires are later revealed to be temporal clones who were displaced from their time.

=== 1994 reboot ===
In 1994, following the events of the Zero Hour crossover, the original continuity of the Legion ended and their story was restarted from the beginning. In this continuity, Gim Allon is known as Leviathan and originates from a human colony on Mars rather than Earth. He is the first official leader of the Legion, but resigns after one mission and passes leadership to Cosmic Boy.

Leviathan is killed after the Emerald Eye of Ekron fulfills his wish to have a heroic death, causing him to die in battle with Doctor Regulus. Shrinking Violet gains Leviathan's power of growth and assumes his codename.

=== 2004 reboot ===
In the 2004 relaunch, Gim Allon is part of a race of giants created by Bizarro Brainiac 200 years prior to the start of the 31st century. Allon considers his superpower to be the ability to shrink to six feet tall and prefers the code name Micro Lad. Still, all Legionnaires, as well as the public in general, know him as Colossal Boy.

=== Post-Infinite Crisis ===
The events of Infinite Crisis restore an analogue of Colossal Boy and the pre-Crisis Legion to continuity. Colossal Boy makes further appearances in Doomsday Clock and The New Golden Age, where Doctor Manhattan erases him and the Legion from existence before Superman convinces him to restore them.

== Powers and abilities ==
As Colossal Boy or Leviathan, Gim Allon can increase his size into many times normal height, with strength proportionate in mass. He additionally possesses expertise in law enforcement. In the 2004 and 2019 reboots of the Legion of Super-Heroes, he is normally giant-sized and can shrink down to six feet tall.

As a member of the Legion of Super-Heroes, Gim Allon is provided a Legion Flight Ring, which allows him to fly and survive in the vacuum of space and other dangerous environments. Brainiac 5 modified his ring so it would enlarge with him, supporting the additional mass.

== In other media ==
=== Television ===
- Gim Allon as Colossal Boy makes a non-speaking cameo appearance in the Justice League Unlimited episode "Far From Home".
- Gim Allon as Colossal Boy appears in Legion of Super Heroes, voiced by Adam Wylie.

=== Video games ===
Gim Allon as Colossal Boy appears as a character summon in Scribblenauts Unmasked: A DC Comics Adventure.

=== Miscellaneous ===
- Gim Allon as Colossal Boy appears in Batman '66 Meets the Legion of Super-Heroes.
- Gim Allon as Colossal Boy appears in Teen Titans Go! #25.
