= Ilana Löwy =

Historian of biomedical sciences

- Born: Ilana Zelmanowicz; 1948 (age 77–78); Łódź, Poland
- Education: Tel Aviv University, Paris Diderot University
- Occupations: historian of life sciences, feminist scholar
- Employer: CERMES-3 (Inserm-CNRS-EHESS)

Ilana Löwy (née Zelmanowicz) (born 1948) is a Polish-born French historian of biomedical sciences. She works as a research director at an interdisciplinary and cross-institutional research unit CERMES-3 (Centre de recherche médecine, sciences, santé, santé mentale, société, Inserm-CNRS-EHESS), and is associated with the Department of Global Health and Social Medicine at King's College London, the Department of the History of Science at Harvard University and Casa de Oswaldo Cruz, Fiocruz, Rio de Janeiro.

== Biography ==
Born in a Jewish family in Poland, her parents decided to leave for Israel in 1957. She gained her Msc in microbiology and biochemistry from Tel Aviv University in 1971, and her PhD (Doctorat D'Etat es Sciences) from Paris VII University in 1977.

== Career ==
At the beginning of her career, Löwy worked at the Institut Pasteur at the Cellular immunity lab. Her interest in the history of science initially evolved around the history of organ transplantation, bacteriology, immunology, virology and tropical medicine. With an increasing interest in human reproduction and cancer, her work covers an extensive study of biomedical analysis and gender studies. She has extensively published on Ludwik Fleck, Polish historian and philosopher of medicine. Her current (2017) research focuses on prenatal diagnosis, genetics and congenital disorders.

== Publications ==
=== Authored monographs ===
- The Polish School of Philosophy of Medicine: From Tytus Chalubinski (1820–1889) to Ludwik Fleck (1896–1961), Dordrecht: Kluwer Academic Publications (Philosophy of Medicine Series),1990.
- Between Bench and Bedside: Science, Healing and Interleukin-2 in a Cancer Ward, Cambridge, MA: Harvard University Press, 1996 (French translation, Cancer des chercheurs, cancer des cliniciens: Trajectoire d'une innovation thérapeutique, Archives d’Historie Contemporaine, 2002) .
- Medical Acts and Medical Facts: The Polish Tradition of Practice Grounded Reflections on Medicine and Science, (in English), Krakow: Polish Academy of Sciences, 2000.
- Virus, moustiques et modernité: La fièvre jaune au Brésil entre science et politique, Paris: Archives d’Historie Contemporaine, 2001. (Portuguese translation: Virus, mosquitos e modernidade: A febre amarela no Brasil entre ciência e politica, Rio de Janeiro, Manguinhos, 2005)
- L'emprise du genre: Masculinité, féminité, inégalité, Paris: La Dispute, 2006. (Polish translation: Okowy Rodzaju, Bydgoszcz, Epigram, 2012).
- Pour en finir avec la domination masculine, Paris: Les Empecheurs de Penser en Rond/ Seuil, 2007. (with Catherine Marry)
- Preventive Strikes: Women, Precancer and Prophylactic Surgery, Johns Hopkins University Press, 2009.
- A Woman's Disease: A History of Cervical Cancer, Oxford University Press, 2011.
- Imperfect Pregnancies. A History of Birth Defects and Prenatal Diagnosis, Johns Hopkins University Press, 2017, ISBN 9781421423630.
- Tangled Diagnoses: Prenatal Testing, Women, and Risk, Chicago, University of Chicago Press, 2018.
- Viruses and Reproductive Injustice. Zika in Brazil, Baltimore, Johns Hopkins University Press, 2024.

=== Edited volumes ===
- Ilana Löwy (ed.), Medicine and Change: Historical and Sociological Studies of Medical Innovation, Paris & Londres: Editions INSERM-John Libbey, 1993.
- Jean Paul Gaudillière &I lana Löwy (eds.), The Invisible Industrialist: Manufactures and the Production of Scientific Knowledge, London: Macmillan,1998.
- Delphine Gardey and Ilana Löwy (eds.), L'invention du naturel: Les sciences et la fabrication du masculin et du feminin, Paris: Archives d'Histoire Contemporaine, 2000.
- Ilana Löwy and Patrick Zylberman (guest eds.), The Rockefeller Foundation and Biomedical Sciences, special issue of Studies in History and Philosophy of Biological and Biomedical Sciences, 2000.
- Jean Paul Gaudillière and Ilana Löwy (eds.), Heredity and Infection: Historical Essays on the Transmission of Human Diseases, London and New York: Routledge, 2001.
- Ilana Löwy and John Krige (eds.), Science, Public Health and Images of Disease: Europe, 1945–1995, Bruxelles: European Commission's Editions, 2001.
- Ilana Löwy & Hélène Rouch (eds), La distinction entre sexe et genre: Une historie entre biologie et culture, Paris: L'Harmattan, 2003.
- Ilana Löwy (guest ed.), Ludwik Fleck: Epistemology and Biomedical Sciences, special issue of Studies in History and Philosophy of Biological and Biomedical Sciences, 2004.
- Johannes Fehr, Nathalie Jas and Ilana Lowy (eds.), Penser avec Fleck—Investigating a Life, Studying Life Sciences, Zurich: Collegium Helveticum, 2009.
- Ilana Löwy (ed), Microscopic Slides: Reassessing a Neglected Historical Resource, special issue of History and Philosophy of Life Sciences, 2013: 35.

== See also ==
- Science, technology and society
- History of medicine
- Ludwik Fleck
- Feminism
