= Nofei Prat =

Israeli settlement in the West Bank

Nofei Prat: נוֹפֵי פְּרָת (Hebrew)
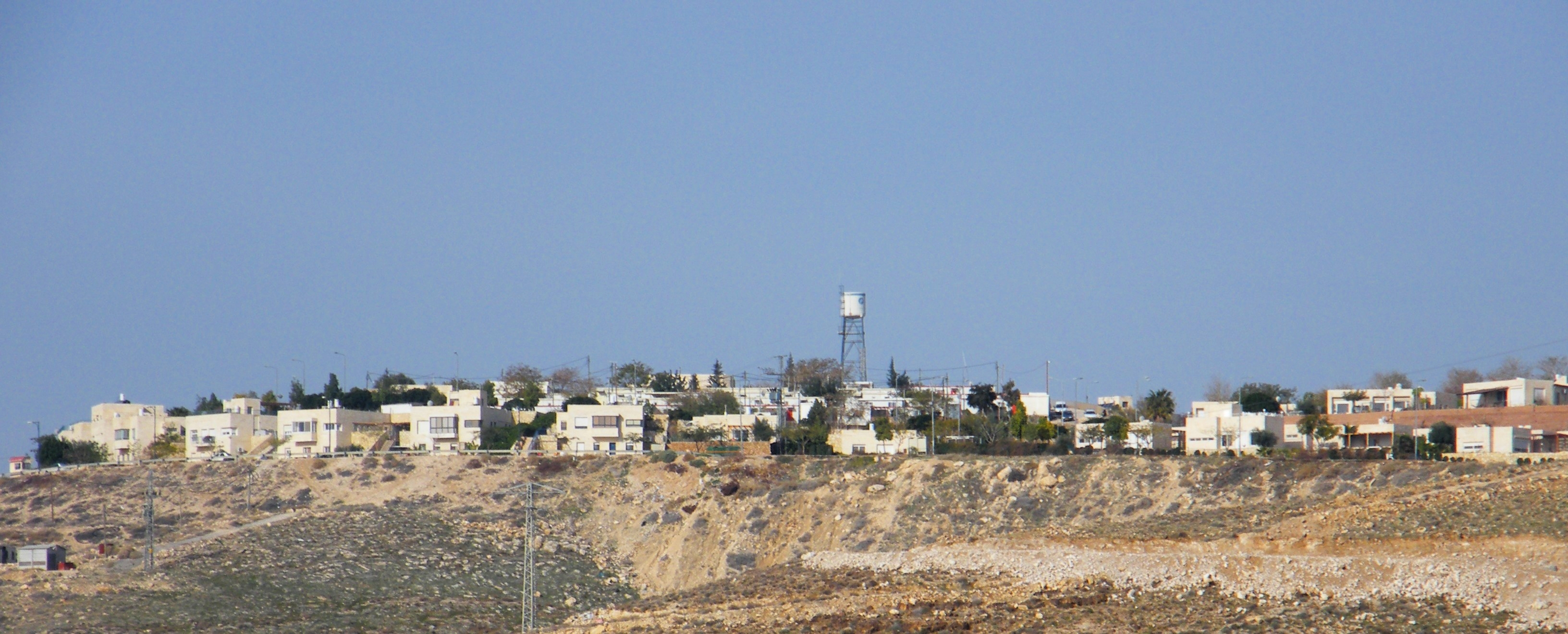

- Location within the Central West Bank
- Coordinates: 31°49′26″N 35°19′12″E
- Country: Palestine
- District: Judea and Samaria Area
- Council: Mateh Binyamin
- Region: West Bank
- Founded: 1992
- Founder: Jerusalem residents

Nofei Prat (Hebrew: נוֹפֵי פְּרָת, lit. 'Prat Scenes') is an Israeli settlement organized as a community settlement in the West Bank. Located near Ma'ale Adumim, it falls under the jurisdiction of Mateh Binyamin Regional Council. In 2006 around 90 families were living in the settlement. In 2009 about 140 families lived there. Both religious and secular families live in Nofei Prat.

The international community considers Israeli settlements in the occupied West Bank, including East Jerusalem, illegal under international law, but the Israeli government disputes this.

== History ==
The village was established in 1992 by a group of settlers from Jerusalem. It was named after the nearby Prat Stream. On the morning after the elections for the thirteenth Knesset and Israeli Labor Party victory and before the transition of power was made, a mixed group of mostly single religious and non-religious students from the Hebrew University drove east from Jerusalem to a barren hilltop with a plan to create a mixed community. They erected a flimsy structure which would later that day be followed by twenty-seven trailers.

== Legal Status ==
Nofei Prat is widely regarded by the international community as illegal under international law according to the Fourth Geneva Convention (article 49), which prohibits an occupying power from transferring citizens from its own territory to occupied territory. Israel maintains that international conventions relating to occupied land do not apply to the West Bank because they were not under the legitimate sovereignty of any state in the first place. This view was rejected by the International Court of Justice and the International Committee of the Red Cross.

According to the ARIJ, Nofei Prat is located on land confiscated from the Palestinian town of 'Anata. According to Geoffrey Aronson, Nofei Prat was established as a neighborhood of the settlement of Kfar Adumim in order to circumvent a promise not to construct new settlements.

== Transportation ==
Nofei Prat was one of a number of settlements linked by a road secretly built by settlers in 1995. The road links Anatot to Kfar Adumim, Nofei Prat, and Alon. According to Pinhas Wallerstein, then head of the Mateh Binyamin Regional Council, the road was one of a number of secretly built roads under construction in the area. Wallerstein claimed that as council head, he did not need permission to construct roads, but that he would stop construction if the Israel Defense Forces told him to. He also said "What are they going to do, tell us to take the road away? If the road is illegal let them take us to court."

== Design ==
The settlement's master plan and its first 33 houses were designed by Jerusalem architect Marcy Goldwasser.

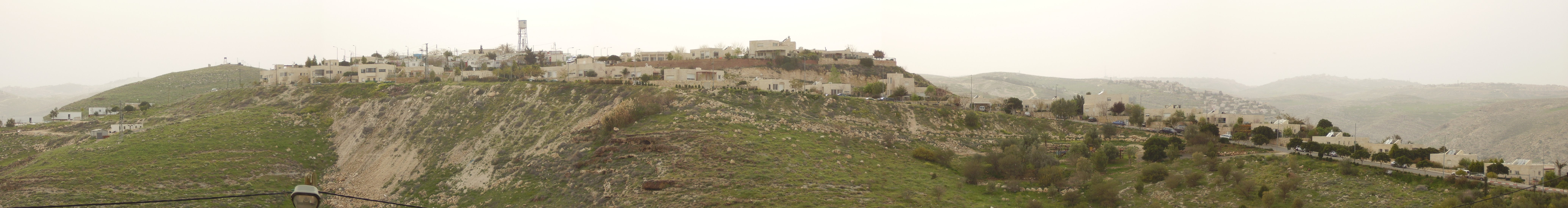
Nofei Prat as viewed from Almon
