= George Allon =

English footballer (1899–1983)

Personal information
- Full name: George Thomas Allon
- Date of birth: 27 August 1899
- Place of birth: Blyth, England
- Date of death: 1983 (aged 83–84)
- Height: 5 ft 9 1/2 in (1.77 m)
- Position: Right half

Senior career*
| Years | Team | Apps | (Gls) |
- Usworth Colliery
| 1921–1924 | Coventry City | 74 | (2) |
- Nuneaton Town
- Peterborough & Fletton United
| 1926–1932 | Northampton Town | 185 | (7) |
| 1932–1933 | Wigan Athletic | | |
| Total | | 259 | (9) |
- * Club domestic league appearances and goals

George Thomas Allon (27 August 1899 – 1983) was a footballer who played in the Football League for Coventry City and Northampton Town. He also played for Wigan Athletic, making 41 appearances in the Cheshire League.
