= Ilana Panich-Linsman =

Ilana Panich-Linsman (born 1984) is a visual journalist based in Austin, Texas.

== Early life and education ==
Panich-Linsman was born in Arizona and grew up in western Massachusetts. She received a B.A. from Scripps College. She completed the Eddie Adams Workshop in 2009. In 2014. she received an M.A. in photojournalism from the University of the Arts, London, U.K. Panich-Linsman, graduated from the International Center of Photography's photojournalism program.

== Major works ==
Panich-Linsman feels that photojournalists are drawn to documentary subjects for a reason. In general, the stories she shoots are stories that she particularly cares about. "I’m interested in women’s and children’s issues, immigration and healthcare."

These interests have been the motivation for several of her major projects. Supported by a Rita K. Hillman Foundation grant she reported on children in a pediatric palliative care unit and their parents.

This particular project gave me an opportunity to begin to understand what it is like for a family to support a critically ill child, and for a palliative-care team to support that family. Perhaps it is a way to face my own fears.

Curious about cultural differences when a girl begins to define herself as a woman, she followed this idea from Brooklyn to Palestinian refugee camps in Lebanon and Jordan. She juxtaposed two sets of photographs, one from Brooklyn and one from the Mideast, and, found remarkable similarities.

Long fascinated with the child beauty-pageant industry, she was interested in learning more about the motivations of the parents and the child, as well as the idea of western beauty ideals. Panich-Linsman explores this coming-of-age theme in rural Westfield, Massachusetts, where 12-year-old Emily and her mom spend more time at beauty salons than at parties. The result was the photo series, "The Tree and the Apple"

Panich-Linsman reported on the plight of Central American families attempting to immigrate to the U.S. for the New York Times. "With their belongings close and their children closer," with video and photographs, she documented the scene at a McAllen, Texas, bus station, which was described as America's new Ellis Island. Panich-Linsman took frame by frame photos of the migrants waiting in line, to develop a panoramic image. The Times felt this was critical to the story, emphazing to the readers that the migrants are real people. According to the New York Times reporter discussing the article: "What makes this story stand out is the visual focus on the migrants, some who risked their lives to stand in line at that bus station." Panich-Linsman also conducted on-the-fly interviews with migrants in 105-degree heat about the next phase in their lives. Panich-Linsman has worked at the border extensively since moving to Texas in 2014.

Other works from south Texas include features about a female mariachi band, girls growing up in a border town and difficulties for children with transgender identity.

Border cities like those in the Rio Grande Valley have been the subject of increased national coverage since President Trump's election. Since the start of 2019, in hopes they might better learn about, and from, the people who make their homes there, The New York Times has assigned Ilana Panich-Linsman to live and work in McAllen, Texas.

For NBC in 2025, Panich-Linsman photographed parents who lost their daughters in the Camp Mystic flood.

== Honors ==
- Multimedia Award at the 2010 Lumix Festival for Young Photojournalism
- Magnum Photo's 30 under 30

== Bibliography ==
- Roe v. Wade abortion history
- A cowgirl hits the road
- Frenzied lives of teenage girls in the city
- Portraits
- Navajo child custody fight
