= Anathoth =

City in the Hebrew Bible

Coordinates: 31.8141°N 35.2647°E

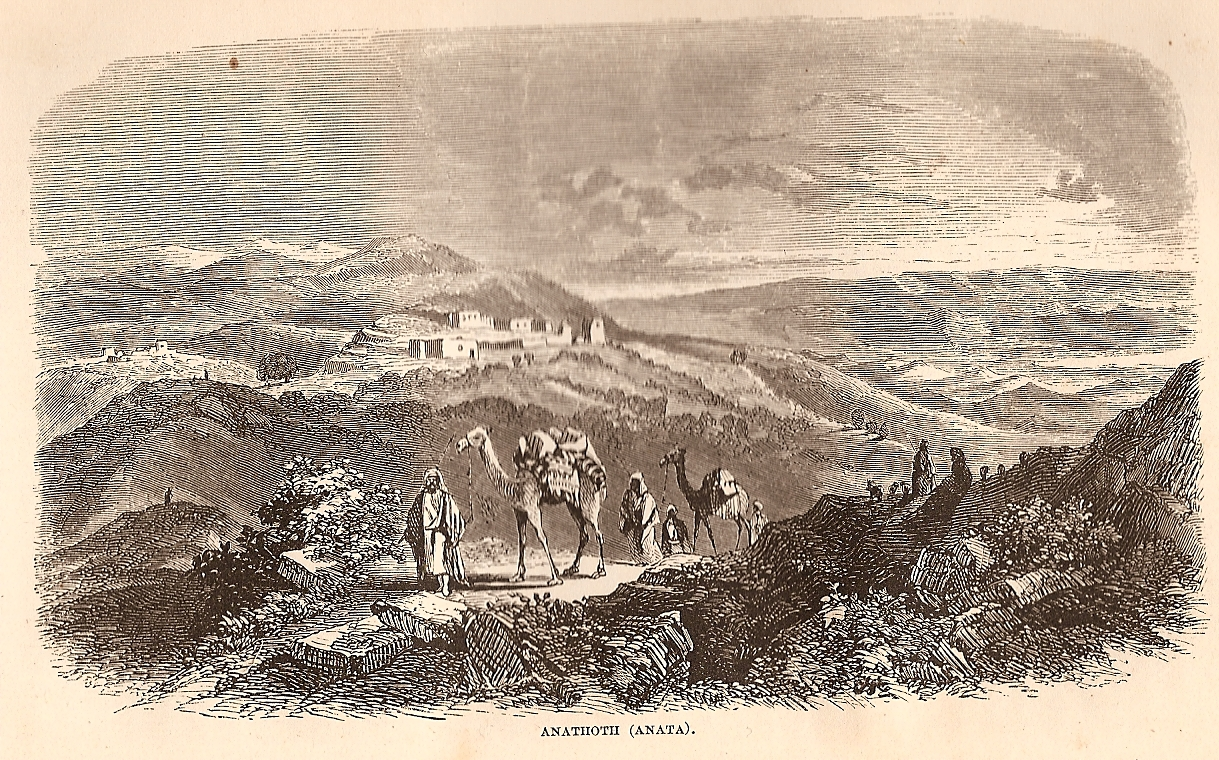

Anathoth /ˈænəˌθɒθ/ is the name of one of the Levitical cities given to "the children of Aaron" in the tribe of Benjamin (Joshua 21:13–18; 1 Chronicles 6:54–60). Residents were called Antothites or Anetothites.

== Etymology ==
The name of this town may be derived from a Canaanite goddess, `Anat. It is also used as an Israelite personal name in 1 Chronicles (1 Chr 7:8), and in Nehemiah (Neh 10:19).

== History according to the Hebrew Bible ==
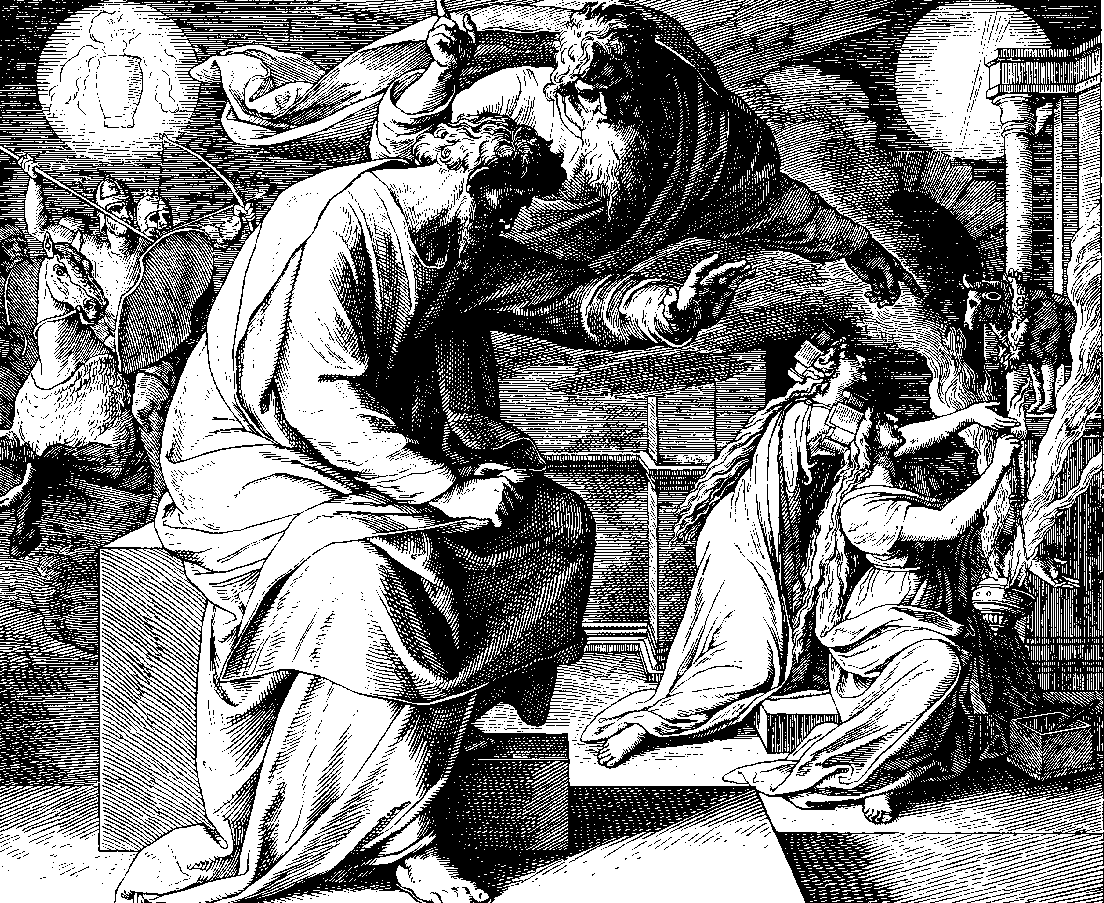
The Call of Jeremiah occurred in Anathoth, depicted in this 1860 woodcut by Julius Schnorr von Karolsfeld

Anathoth is mentioned as the native place of Abiezer the Anetothite, one of David's "thirty" (2 Samuel 23:27), and of Jehu, another of his mighty men (1 Chr 12:3). King Solomon banishes Abiathar the Priest to Anathoth, "unto thine own fields". It is perhaps best known as the home town of the prophet Jeremiah (Jer 1:1; 29:27; 32:7–9). He delivers a prophecy of tribulation by the sword against the residents of Anathoth, who were plotting against him (Jer 11:21–23).

Anathoth suffered greatly from the army of Nebuchadnezzar, and only 128 men returned to it from the Babylonian exile (Neh 7:27; Ezra 2:23). It lay about 3 miles north of Jerusalem.

== Modern identification ==
In the early 19th century, the Palestinian village of 'Anata was identified as the site of Anathoth by Edward Robinson. Robinson's identification echoes that of Epiphanius. The neighboring modern Israeli settlement of Almon is also known as 'Anatot'.

Abu Ghosh has also been associated with Anathoth by Conder and Kitchener in their 1883 Survey of Western Palestine.

== In Christianity ==
Some Christians believe that Jeremiah prophesied that the field there would be bought from money by the chief priests, that Judas Iscariot had returned after he had betrayed Jesus before he hanged himself, an interpretation possibly favored by the Gospel of Matthew. (Jeremiah 32:1–15; Matthew 27:3-10) Other readers suggest that Jeremiah 32 simply shows Jeremiah purchasing the field as one of his many prophetic actions, indicating that the Babylonian captivity would come to an end and the people would return to Judah.
