= Ilanit (name) =

Ilanit (Hebrew: אילנית) is a Hebrew given name and surname. Notable people with the name include:

- Ilanit, stage name of the Israeli actress Hanna Dresner-Tzak

== Given name ==
- Hila Ilanit Elmalich, Israeli fashion model
- Ilanit Ben-Yaakov, Israeli actress
- Ilanit Levi, Israeli actress and TV presenter, Miss Israel 2001

== Surname ==
- Fayge Ilanit, Israeli politician
