= Elon (name) =

- Gender: Male

Origin
- Origin: Hebrew
- Meaning: Oak tree
- Region of origin: Israel

Other names
- Related names: Alon, Ilan

Elon (אֵילוֹן in Hebrew) is a masculine first name, or Jewish surname, which means "oak tree" in the Hebrew language. Variants of the name include Alon, Eilan, Eilon, and Elan; it can also be a variant spelling of Ilan and Ilon (Hebrew: אילן), of the similar meaning "tree".

The given name became more popular in the 2010s (from No. 3,310 in 2008 to No. 885 in 2018 for baby boys in the United States) due to the rise to fame of Elon Musk, though he is not Jewish.

== Given name ==
- Elon, father of Basemath, wife of Esau in the Bible
- Elon, the second son of Zebulun
- Elon (Judges), biblical leader of the Israelites in the Book of Judges
- Elon R. Brown (1857–1922), American politician
- Elon Howard Eaton (1866–1934), American ornithologist
- Elon J. Farnsworth (1837–1863), American general
- Elon Farnsworth (1799–1877), American lawyer and politician
- Elon Galusha (1790–1856), American preacher
- Elon Ganor (born 1950), Israeli businessman
- Elon Gasper (born 1951), American computer scientist
- Elon Gold (born 1970), American comedian and actor
- Elon Hogsett (1903–2001), American baseball player
- Elon Huntington Hooker (1869–1938), American businessman
- Elon Jones (born 1960), Barbadian cricketer
- Elon Lages Lima (1929–2017), Brazilian mathematician
- Elon Lindenstrauss (born 1970), Israeli mathematician
- Elon Musk (born 1971), business magnate and CEO of SpaceX, Tesla, Twitter/X and others
- Elon James White (born 1978), American journalist
- Eilon Solan (born 1969), Israeli mathematician and sci-fi writer
- Eilona Ariel (born 1958), Israeli filmmaker
- Eylon Levy (born 1991), British-Israeli public diplomacy figure

== Surname ==
- Amos Elon (1926–2009), Israeli writer
- Ari Elon (born 1950), Israeli writer
- Binyamin Elon (1954–2017), Israeli politician
- Danae Elon (born 1970), Israeli documentary filmmaker
- Emuna Elon (born 1955), Israeli writer
- Menachem Elon (1923–2013), Israeli judge
- Mordechai Elon (born 1959), Israeli rabbi
- Ori Elon (born 1981), Israeli writer
- Naomi Eilan, British philosopher
- Ya'akov Eilon (born 1961), Israeli television presenter and journalist

== Characters ==
- Elon (Legends of Chima), a character in Legends of Chima
- Elon Muskox, a mosaiculture horticultural living sculpture at City Hall in Yellowknife, NWT, Canada

== See also ==
- Alon (name)
- Ilan (name)
- Ilona
