= Alon (Israeli settlement) =

Israeli settlement in the West Bank

Alon: אַלּוֹן (Hebrew)
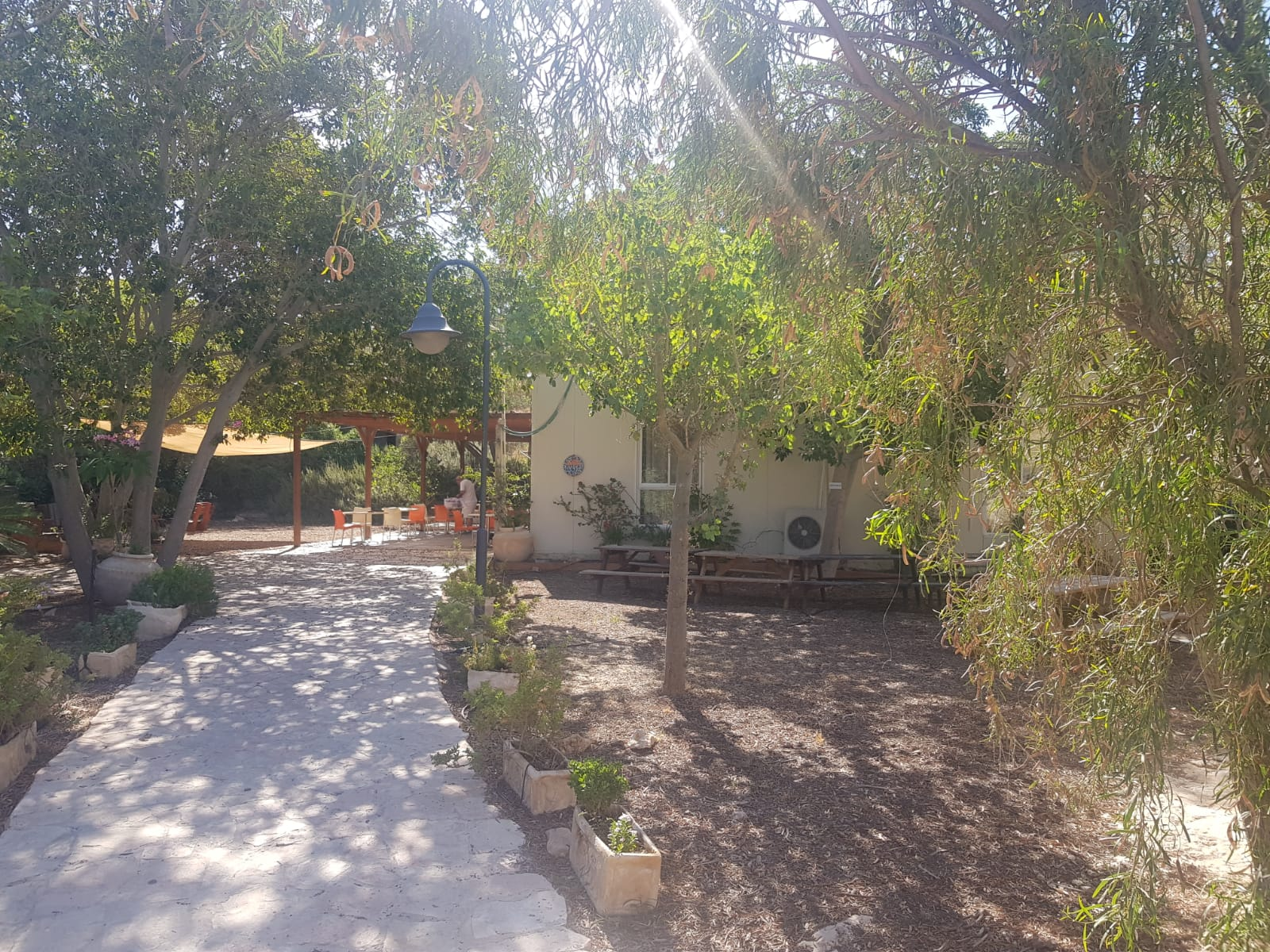

- Location within the Central West Bank
- Coordinates: 31°49′58″N 35°21′13″E
- Country: Palestine
- District: Judea and Samaria Area
- Council: Mateh Binyamin
- Region: West Bank
- Affiliation: Amana
- Founded: 1990
- Population (2024): 1,242

Alon or Allon (Hebrew: אַלּוֹן) is an Israeli settlement in the West Bank, organized as a community settlement. Alon is located to the east of Jerusalem, next to the Palestinian town of 'Anata, part of whose lands were expropriated to build Alon. Situated along the edge of the Judean desert, the settlement has a diverse religiously observant and secular population.

The international community considers Israeli settlements in the West Bank illegal under international law, but the Israeli government disputes this.

== History ==
According to ARIJ, Israel confiscated 328 dunams of land from the Palestinian town of 'Anata in order to construct Alon.

Named after Yigal Allon, it was founded in 1990 by a number of area residents under the aegis of the Amana settlement organisation, it was originally considered to be part of nearby Kfar Adumim so as to minimise opposition in an atmosphere in which the question of settlement was becoming increasingly controversial. Children study in a mixed secular/observant public-religious school in nearby Kfar Adumim, and attend highschool in Jerusalem.

Alon was one of a number of settlements linked by a road secretly built by settlers in 1995. The road links the settlement of Almon to the settlements of Kfar Adumim, Nofei Prat, and Alon. According to Pinhas Wallerstein, then head of the Mateh Binyamin Regional Council, the road was one of a number of secretly built roads under construction in the area. Wallerstein claimed that as council head, he did not need permission to construct roads, but that he would stop construction if told by the Israel Defense Forces. He also said "What are they going to do, tell us to take the road away? If the road is illegal let them take us to court."

== Legal status ==
Alon is widely regarded by the international community to violate the Fourth Geneva Convention's prohibition on the transfer of an occupying power's civilian population into occupied territory. The Israeli government maintains that international conventions relating to occupied land do not apply to the West Bank, as it had not been legally held by a sovereign prior to Israel taking control of it. This view has been rejected by the International Court of Justice and the International Committee of the Red Cross.

== Gallery ==
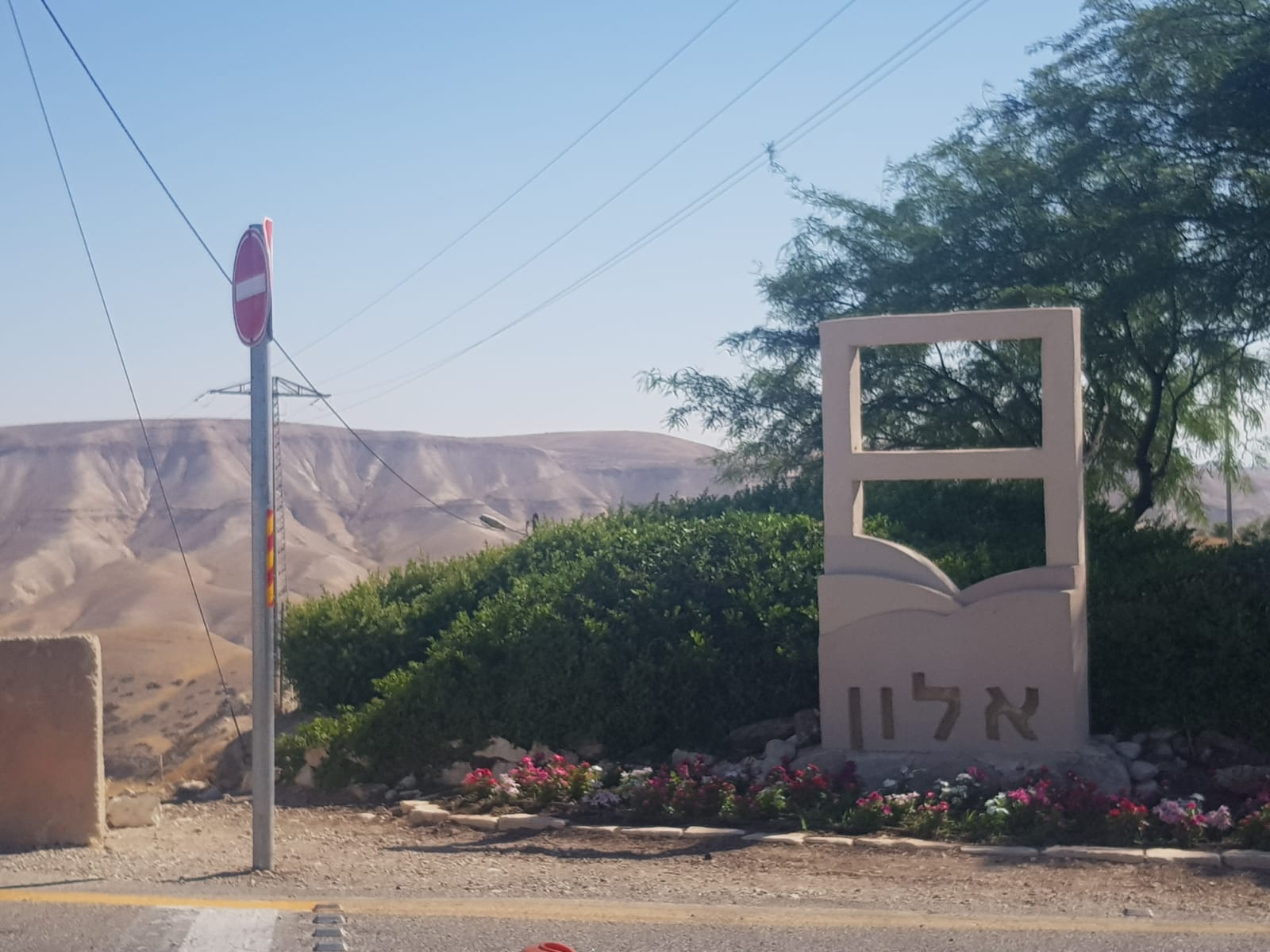
The entrance to the settlement

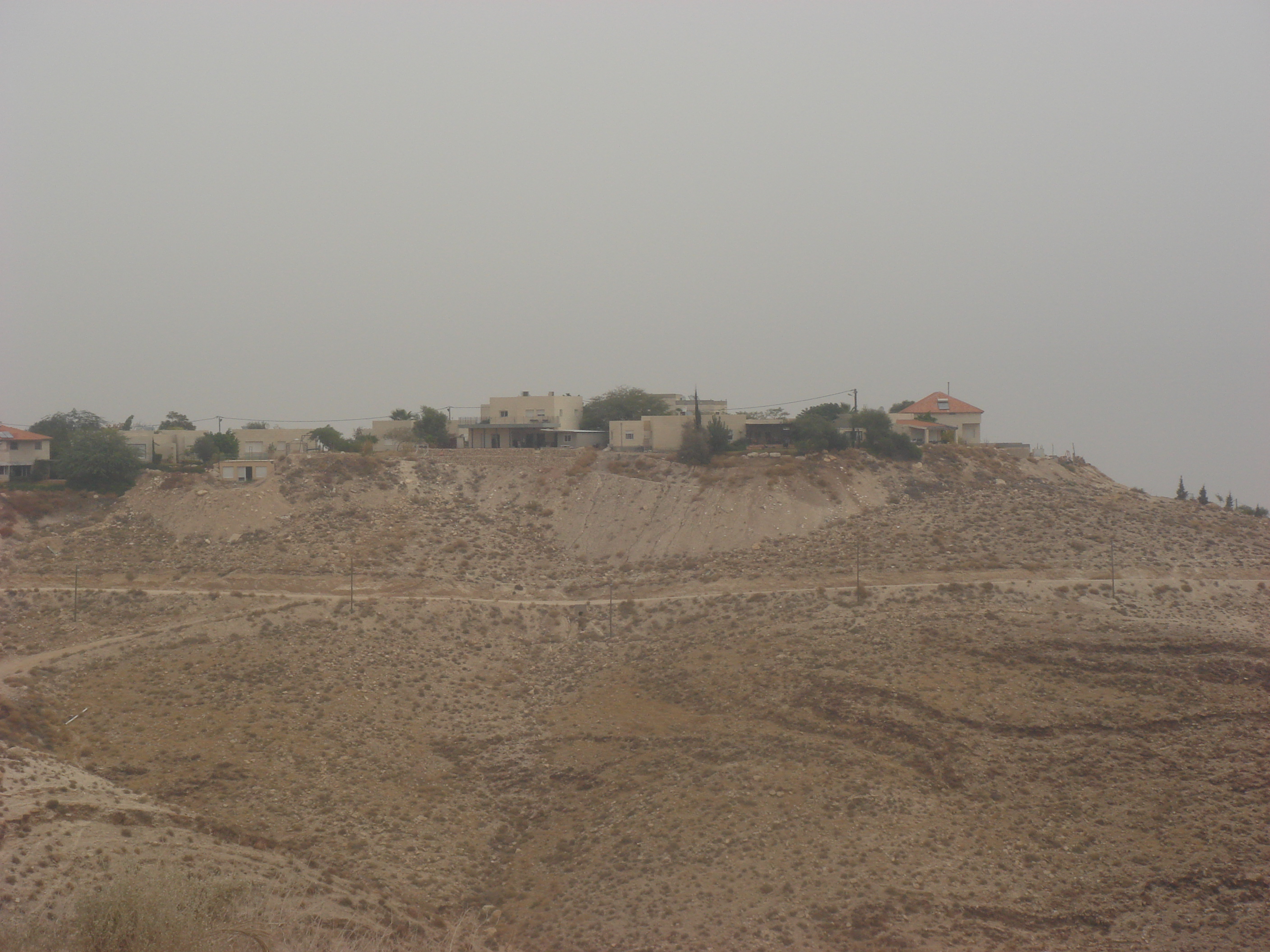
Southern side of the settlement

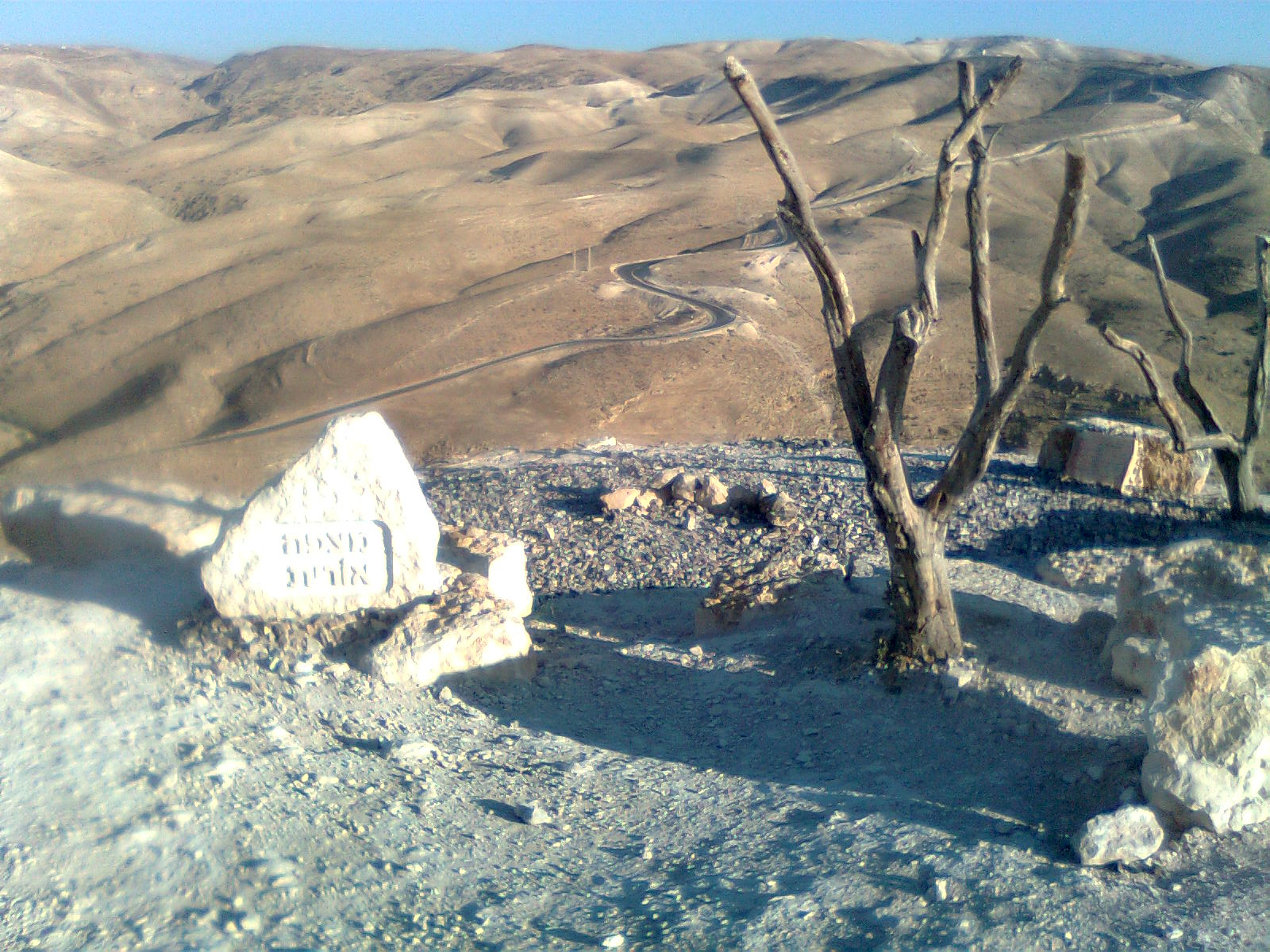
"Orit" lookout spot, located near the settlement
