= Aloni =

Aloni is a surname. Notable people with the surname include:

- Izak Aloni (Schächter) (1905–85), Israeli chess master
- Maria Aloni (born 1969), Italian philosopher
- Michael Aloni (born 1984), Israeli actor
- Miri Aloni (born 1949), Israeli folk singer
- Nimrod Aloni (born 1973), a general in the Israeli Defense Forces
- Nisim Aloni (1926–1998), Israeli playwright and translator
- Shulamit Aloni (1928–2014), Israeli politician and left-wing activist
- Udi Aloni (born 1959), Israeli-American filmmaker, writer and visual artist
- Yoel Aloni (1937–2019), Israeli chess master and problemist

== See also ==
- Balter, Guth, Aloni & Co. (founded in 1974), Israeli law firm
