= Drama (disambiguation) =

Drama is a form of fiction represented in performance in a theatre or on radio or television.

Drama may also refer to:

== Subgenres of drama ==
- Drama (film and television), a genre of film and television series with an intent for a serious tone
- Comedy drama, a genre made of a combination of comedy and drama
- Docudrama, a genre of film and television that involves dramatized re-enactments of events
- Legal drama, a genre of film and television
- Melodrama, a variant of drama that involves exaggeration of plot and characters to evoke strong emotions
- Political drama, a variant of drama that involves political components

== Music ==
=== Performers and labels ===
- Drama (American band), a dance/R&B duo
- Drama (British band), a rock band
- Drama (Norwegian band), a 1980s boy band
- Drama (rapper) (born 1981), American rapper
- DJ Drama (born 1978), American DJ
- Drama Records, a Puerto Rican record label

=== Albums ===
- Drama (Bananarama album), 2006
- Drama (Bitter:Sweet album) or the title song, 2008
- Drama (Carolin Fortenbacher album), 2008
- Drama (Jamelia album), 2000
- Drama (Jang Minho album) or the title song, 2017
- Drama (Montt Mardié album), 2005
- Drama (Yes album), 1980
- Drama, by Flaw, 2000
- Drama, by Shindy, 2019
- Drama, by Marty Friedman, 2024

=== EPs ===
- Drama (Aespa EP) or the title song, 2023
- Drama (Nine Muses EP) or the title song, 2015
- Drama, by Aaron Yan, 2014

=== Songs ===
- "Drama" (Aespa song), 2023
- "Drama" (AJR song), 2017
- "Drama" (Janalynn Castelino song), 2024
- "Drama" (Kate Miller-Heidke song), 2014
- "Drama!", by Erasure, 1989
- "Drama", by Dave from Psychodrama, 2019
- "Drama", by DJ Kay Slay from The Streetsweeper, Vol. 2, 2004
- "Drama", by Erykah Badu from Baduizm, 1997
- "Drama", by IU from Pieces, 2021
- "Drama", by Ivy Queen from Diva, 2003
- "Drama", by Pink Sweats, 2018
- "Drama", by TXT from The Dream Chapter: Eternity, 2020

== Film and television shows ==
- Drama (2010 film), a Chilean film
- Drama (2012 film), an Indian film directed by Yogaraj Bhat
- Drama (2018 film), an Indian film directed by Ranjith
- Drama (British TV series), a 1977 anthology series
- Drama (Spanish TV series), a 2020 streaming series
- Johnny "Drama" Chase, a character in the HBO television series Entourage

== Television channels ==
- Drama (British TV channel), a UKTV network free-to-air television channel
- Drama (MENA TV channel), a Pan-Arab television channel
- Alibi (TV channel), formerly UK Drama, a pay television channel
- Syrian Drama TV, a government-owned television station
- Sky Drama, a New Zealand television channel

== Places ==
- Drama (regional unit), Greece
  - Drama (constituency), electoral district
  - Drama, Greece, the capital city
- Drama, Šentjernej, a village in Slovenia
- Drama, a village in Yambol Province, Bulgaria

== Other uses ==
- Drama (graphic novel), a 2012 graphic novel by Raina Telgemeier
- Icona drama, a species of comb-footed spider in the family Theridiidae

== See also ==
- Dramatic (disambiguation)
- The Drama (disambiguation)
