= 1977 in British television =

This is a list of British television related events from 1977.

== Events ==
=== January ===
- 1 January – BBC1 airs its network television premiere of the 1971 musical fantasy Willy Wonka & the Chocolate Factory, starring Gene Wilder, Jack Albertson and Peter Ostrum.
- 3 January – The US crime drama series, Charlie's Angels makes its UK debut on ITV, starring Kate Jackson, Farrah Fawcett and Jaclyn Smith as the crime-fighting trio, the "Angels".
- 6 January – The natural history documentary Wildlife on One premieres on BBC1.
- 10 January – ITV broadcasts the first episode of the children's folk horror drama Children of the Stones.
- 11 January – ITV debuts Robin's Nest, the spin-off sitcom to Man About the House, and once again starring Richard O'Sullivan.

=== February ===
- 3 February – The Annan Committee on the future of broadcasting makes its recommendations. They include the establishment of a fourth independent television channel, the establishment of Broadcasting Complaints Commission and an increase in independent production.
- 14 February – BBC1 debuts the children's animated series The Flumps, which, although only thirteen episodes are produced, will be broadcast on the BBC until 1988.
- 15 February – The first Aardman Animations character, the Morph, is introduced with the launch of BBC children's series Take Hart with Tony Hart.
- 24 February – ITV begins showing the US medical mystery drama series Quincy, M.E., starring Jack Klugman.
- 26 February – The network television premiere of the 1965 James Bond film Thunderball airs on ITV, starring Sean Connery in his fourth 007 adventure.
- February – Michael Grade is appointed as Director of Programmes at London Weekend Television.

=== March ===
- 11 March – Mister Trimble is broadcast for the final time.
- 21 March – BBC1 airs the network premiere of Nicholas Roeg's 1971 Australian-set survival film Walkabout, starring Jenny Agutter.
- 24 March – ITV shows the network television premiere of the 1968 science fiction film Planet of the Apes, starring Charlton Heston and Roddy McDowall.
- 27 March – Jesus of Nazareth, a British-Italian television miniseries directed by Franco Zeffirelli and co-produced by Lew Grade which dramatises the birth, life, ministry, death and resurrection of Jesus based on the accounts in the four New Testament Gospels makes its debut on British television, starring Robert Powell, Olivia Hussey, Stacy Keach, Laurence Olivier, Ian Holm, Peter Ustinov and James Farentino.
- 28 March – Yorkshire Television and Tyne Tees Television launch a nine-week breakfast television experiment. It is credited as being the United Kingdom's first breakfast television programme, six years before the launch of TV-am and the BBC's Breakfast Time in 1983. Both programmes run at the same time, with Tyne Tees' Good Morning North and Yorkshire's Good Morning Calendar. Both programmes finish on Friday 27 May.

=== April ===
- 7 April – BBC1 begins showing a new series of the American cartoon The Scooby-Doo Show, following several years of repeating older episodes.
- 11 April – Stepping Stones, a television programme for preschoolers and the replacement programme for Mister Trimble, makes its debut on ITV.
- 12 April – The pilot of John Sullivan's sitcom Citizen Smith, starring Robert Lindsay as Walter Henry "Wolfie" Smith, airs on BBC1.
- 22 April – The original version of motoring programme Top Gear begins as a local monthly magazine format produced by (and shown only by) BBC Midlands. from its Pebble Mill Studios in Birmingham, presented by Angela Rippon and Tom Coyne. In July 1978, it is offered to BBC2, where it airs until 2001. In 2002, the series is relaunched in a new format.

=== May ===
- 7 May – The 22nd Eurovision Song Contest is held at Wembley Conference Centre in London and broadcast on BBC1. With Angela Rippon as the presenter, the contest is won by Marie Myriam representing France, with the song "L'oiseau et l'enfant" (The Bird and the Child). The British entry, "Rock Bottom", written and sung by Lynsey de Paul and Mike Moran finishes in second place.

=== June ===
- 6–9 June – Television viewers in Britain watch live coverage of the celebrations of the Silver Jubilee of Elizabeth II, while the soap opera Coronation Street features an elaborate Jubilee parade in the storyline, having Rovers' Return Inn manageress Annie Walker dress up in elaborate costume as Queen Elizabeth I. Ken Barlow and Uncle Albert play Edmund Hillary and Sherpa Tenzing respectively.
- 11 June – BBC1 begins showing the horror-themed anthology series Supernatural.
- 20 June – Anglia Television broadcasts the documentary Alternative 3. It enters into the conspiracy theory canon.
- 22 June – ITV shows the Michael Caine starring 1971 adventure film Kidnapped, based on the novel by Robert Louis Stevenson.

=== July ===
- 2 July – BBC2 launches a new season of Saturday evening horror movie double bills with Dracula, Frankenstein – and Friends!, showing the 1931 Dracula film with Bela Lugosi and the 1931 Frankenstein with Boris Karloff.
- 6 July – The first episode of the BBC documentary series Brass Tacks is aired, featuring a debate as to whether Myra Hindley should be considered for parole from the life sentence she received for her role in the Moors murders in 1966.

=== September ===
- 7 September – The game show The Krypton Factor makes its debut on ITV, presented by Gordon Burns.
- 10 September – The Saturday morning children's show Tiswas returns for a fourth series with new presenter Sally James appearing alongside Chris Tarrant, and for several episodes Jim Davidson. It is now broadcast to several ITV regions: Midlands, Anglia, HTV and Border.
- 12 September – Thames Television launches Thames at Six, a regional news programme that replaces the more light-hearted magazine programme Today.
- 18 September – The occasional ITV bloopers programme It'll Be Alright on the Night is first broadcast, presented by Denis Norden.
- 19 September – BBC Schools and Colleges changes to use the Dots ident with rotating text until 1978.
- 24 September – ITV begins showing the US science fiction fantasy series Man from Atlantis, starring Patrick Duffy.

=== October ===
- 1 October – Ian Trethowan succeeds Charles Curran as Director-General of the BBC.
- 17 October – BBC1 launches the long-running variety and chat show Des O'Connor Tonight.
- 19 October – The first edition of a new weekly magazine programme for Asian women, Gharbar, is broadcast. The programme had only been intended to run for 26 weeks, but continues for around 500 weeks, finally ending in April 1987. The programme airs on Wednesdays at 10.20am, displacing that day's Service Information, which is moved to 11.30am, airing after Play School.
- 21 October – The World Administrative Radio Conference assigns five high-powered direct broadcast by satellite channels for domestic use in the UK.

=== November ===
- 1 November – BBC1 screens the Mike Leigh comedy drama Abigail's Party as part of the Play for Today series.
- 13 November – BBC1 airs the final episode of the sitcom Dad's Army.
- 19 November – Southern Television broadcasts the US children's series Sesame Street for the first time.
- 20 November – The network television premiere of the 1967 James Bond film You Only Live Twice on ITV, starring Sean Connery.
- 26 November – Southern Television broadcast interruption: Just after 5:10pm in the Southern Television ITV region, a hoaxer hijacks the sound of Independent Television News from the IBA transmitter at Hannington, Hampshire and broadcasts a message claiming to be a representative of the Ashtar Galactic Command. Thousands of viewers ring Southern, the IBA, ITN or the police for an explanation; the identity of the intruder is never confirmed.

=== December ===
- 22 December – BBC2 shows an adaptation of Bram Stoker's vampire novel Count Dracula, starring Louis Jordan.
- 24 December
  - ITV airs Bing Crosby's Merrie Olde Christmas. The Christmas television special marked Bing Crosby's final screen appearance in which he duets with David Bowie on Peace on Earth/Little Drummer Boy.
  - BBC2 screens the network television premiere of Robert Altman's 1970 Korean War-set comedy M*A*S*H, starring Donald Sutherland and Elliott Gould.
- 25 December – Both the Mike Yarwood Christmas Show and The Morecambe & Wise Christmas Show on BBC1 attract an audience of more than 28 million, one of the highest ever in British television history.
- 27 December – The network television premiere of Douglas Trumbull's 1972 science fiction drama Silent Running on BBC1, starring Bruce Dern.
- 30 December
  - ITV debuts the crime-action series The Professionals starring Lewis Collins and Martin Shaw as CI5 agents Bodie and Doyle.
  - The adult education themed sitcom Mind Your Language is first broadcast on ITV. Although highly popular, gaining eighteen million viewers, it would eventually be cancelled after the third series, due to its racial stereotypes.
- 31 December
  - BBC1 begins showing the animated series The New Adventures of Batman.
  - Bruce Forsyth steps down as presenter of The Generation Game after six years. He would return to the programme when it is revived by the BBC in 1990.

=== Undated ===
- Scum, an entry in BBC1's Play for Today anthology strand, is pulled from transmission due to controversy over its depiction of life in a Young Offenders' Institution, at this time known in the United Kingdom as a borstal. Two years later, director Alan Clarke makes a film version with most of the same cast, and the original play itself is eventually transmitted on BBC2 in 1991.
- Emmerdale Farm moves from daytime to a peak time (7pm) slot although five regions, Anglia Television, Thames Television, Westward Television, Grampian Television and Scottish Television air the programme at 5:15pm, with the days sometime changing.

== Debuts ==
=== BBC1 ===
- 2 January – Wings (1977–1978)
- 5 January – Rosie (1977–1981)
- 6 January – Wildlife on One (1977–2005)
- 7 January – Mr. Big (1977)
- 9 January – Rascal the Raccoon (1977)
- 11 January – Look and Read: The King's Dragon (1977)
- 1 February – Fathers and Families (1977)
- 13 February – Rob Roy (1977)
- 14 February – The Flumps (1977; repeated until 1988)
- 15 February – Take Hart (1977–1983)
- 16 March – Out of Bounds (1977)
- 27 March
  - Nicholas Nickleby (1977)
  - Jubilee (1977)
- 5 April – A Roof Over My Head (1977)
- 7 April – The Scooby-Doo Show (1976–1978)
- 8 April – Roots (1977)
- 12 April – Citizen Smith (1977–1980)
- 25 April – Fred Basset (1977)
- 2 May – The Mackinnons (1977)
- 3 May – A Picture of Tom Keating (1977)
- 10 June – No Appointment Necessary (1977)
- 11 June – Supernatural (1977)
- 15 June
  - The House That Jack Built (1977)
  - Middlemen (1977)
- 4 September – The Eagle of the Ninth (1977)
- 7 September – Secret Army (1977–1979)
- 9 September – Target (1977–1978)
- 10 September – The Peppermint Pig (1977)
- 17 October – Des O'Connor Tonight (1977–2002)
- 1 November
  - Abigail's Party (Play for Today) (1977)
  - The Other One (1977–1978)
- 2 November – King Cinder (1977)
- 9 November — The Emigrants (miniseries) (1977)
- 13 November – The Children of the New Forest (1977)
- 13 December – Come Back Mrs. Noah (1977–1978)
- 31 December – The New Adventures of Batman (1977)

=== BBC2 ===
- 10 January – Eleanor Marx (1977)
- 26 January – The Velvet Glove (1977)
- 7 February – Headmaster (1977)
- 20 February – Drama (1977)
- 8 March – Three Piece Suite (1977)
- 10 April – Esther Waters (1977)
- 18 April – Don't Forget to Write! (1977–1979)
- 22 April – Top Gear (1977–2001)
- 8 May – Murder Most English (1977)
- 12 May – Sea Tales (1977) (Anthology)
- 13 June – Maidens' Trip (1977)
- 2 July – Dracula, Frankenstein – and Friends! (1977)
- 6 July – Brass Tacks (1977–1988)
- 16 August – Marie Curie (1977)
- 18 September – 1990 (1977–1978)
- 19 September – The Long Search (1977)
- 21 September – BBC2 Play of the Week (1977–1979)
- 22 September – Premiere (1977–1980)
- 25 September – Anna Karenina (1977)
- 19 October – Parosi (1977–1978)
- 21 October – Kilvert's Diary (1977)
- 7 November – Who Pays the Ferryman? (1977)
- 30 November – Eustace and Hilda (1977)
- 22 December – Count Dracula (1977)

=== ITV ===
- 3 January – Charlie's Angels (1976–1981)
- 5 January – Another Bouquet (1977)
- 10 January – Children of the Stones (1977)
- 11 January – Robin's Nest (1977–1981)
- 16 January – Holding On (1977)
- 6 February – Just William (1977–1978)
- 9 February – Horse in the House (1977)
- 12 February – All You Need Is Love (1977)
- 17 February – The Galton & Simpson Playhouse (1977)
- 24 February – Quincy, M.E. (1976–1983)
- 25 February – Raffles (1977)
- 2 March – Romance (1977)
- 27 March – Jesus of Nazareth (1977)
- 28 March – Jamie and the Magic Torch (1977–79)
- 15 April – Backs to the Land (1977–1978)
- 18 April
  - Miss Jones and Son (1977–1978)
  - The Flockton Flyer (1977–1978)
- 20 April – Dawson and Friends (1977)
- 21 April – Paradise Island (1977)
- 7 May – Dynomutt, Dog Wonder (1976–1977)
- 8 May – King of the Castle (1977)
- 18 May – A Bunch of Fives (1977–1978)
- 29 May – The Sunday Drama (1977–1978)
- 31 May – Burgess, Philby and Maclean (1977)
- 6 June – Two Stars for Comfort (1977)
- 13 June – Cottage to Let (1977)
- 20 June – Alternative 3 (1977)
- 26 June – Follow Me… (1977)
- 6 July – I'm Bob, He's Dickie (1977–1978)
- 8 July – The Foundation (1977–1978)
- 15 July – Devenish (1977)
- 17 July – Hi Summer (1977)
- 28 July – A Sharp Intake of Breath (1977–1981)
- 28 July – The Sound of Laughter (1977)
- 31 July – Here I Stand... (1977)
- 1 August – Lord Tramp (1977)
- 7 August – Took and Co. (1977)
- 24 August – The Paper Lads (1977–1979)
- 6 September
  - London Belongs to Me (1977)
  - You're Only Young Twice (1977–1981)
- 7 September – The Krypton Factor (1977–1995, 2009–2010)
- 8 September – The Fuzz (1977)
- 9 September – Love for Lydia (1977)
- 18 September – It'll Be Alright on the Night (1977–present)
- 19 September – Raven (1977)
- 24 September
  - Man from Atlantis (1977–1978)
  - The Love Boat (1977–1986)
- 25 September – The Cost of Loving (1977)
- 26 September – The Upchat Line (1977)
- 5 October – The Norman Conquests (1977)
- 12 October – Midnight Is a Place (1977–1978)
- 18 October – The Sullivans (1976–1983)
- 25 October – Hard Times (1977)
- 27 October – Odd Man Out (1977)
- 9 November – Dummy (1977)
- 30 December
  - Mind Your Language (1977–1979)
  - The Professionals (1977–1983)

=== Returning after a break of a year or longer ===
- The Rag Trade (1961–1963; 1977–1978)

== Continuing television shows ==
=== 1920s ===
- BBC Wimbledon (1927–1939, 1946–2019, 2021–present)

=== 1930s ===
- Trooping the Colour (1937–1939, 1946–2019, 2023–present)
- The Boat Race (1938–1939, 1946–2019, 2021–present)
- BBC Cricket (1939, 1946–1999, 2020–2024)

=== 1950s ===
- Come Dancing (1950–1998)
- The Good Old Days (1953–1983)
- Panorama (1953–present)
- Crackerjack (1955–1984, 2020–present)
- Opportunity Knocks (1956–1978, 1987–1990)
- This Week (1956–1978, 1986–1992)
- What the Papers Say (1956–2008)
- The Sky at Night (1957–present)
- Blue Peter (1958–present)
- Grandstand (1958–2007)

=== 1960s ===
- Coronation Street (1960–present)
- Songs of Praise (1961–present)
- Z-Cars (1962–1978)
- Animal Magic (1962–1983)
- Doctor Who (1963–1989, 2005–present)
- World in Action (1963–1998)
- Top of the Pops (1964–2006)
- Match of the Day (1964–present)
- Crossroads (1964–1988, 2001–2003)
- Play School (1964–1988)
- Mr. and Mrs. (1965–1999)
- World of Sport (1965–1985)
- Jackanory (1965–1996, 2006)
- Sportsnight (1965–1997)
- It's a Knockout (1966–1982, 1999–2001)
- The Money Programme (1966–2010)
- ITV Playhouse (1967–1982)
- Reksio (1967–1990)
- Magpie (1968–1980)
- The Big Match (1968–2002)
- Nationwide (1969–1983)
- Screen Test (1969–1984)

=== 1970s ===
- The Goodies (1970–1982)
- The Onedin Line (1971–1980)
- The Old Grey Whistle Test (1971–1987)
- The Two Ronnies (1971–1987, 1991, 1996, 2005)
- Clapperboard (1972–1982)
- Crown Court (1972–1984)
- Pebble Mill at One (1972–1986, 1991–1996)
- Rainbow (1972–1992, 1994–1997)
- Are You Being Served? (1972–1985)
- Emmerdale (1972–present)
- Newsround (1972–present)
- Weekend World (1972–1988)
- Pipkins (1973–1981)
- We Are the Champions (1973–1987)
- Last of the Summer Wine (1973–2010)
- That's Life! (1973–1994)
- Happy Ever After (1974–1978)
- Rising Damp (1974–1978)
- Within These Walls (1974–1978)
- It Ain't Half Hot Mum (1974–1981)
- Tiswas (1974–1982)
- Wish You Were Here...? (1974–2003)
- The Good Life (1975–1978)
- The Sweeney (1975–1978)
- Celebrity Squares (1975–1979, 1993–1997, 2014–2015)
- The Cuckoo Waltz (1975–1980)
- Arena (1975–present)
- Jim'll Fix It (1975–1994)
- Gambit (1975–1985, 1995)
- The Muppet Show (1976–1981)
- The Ghosts of Motley Hall (1976–1978)
- When the Boat Comes In (1976–1981)
- Multi-Coloured Swap Shop (1976–1982)
- Rentaghost (1976–1984)
- One Man and His Dog (1976–present)

== Ending this year ==
- 23 February – The Wheeltappers and Shunters Social Club (1974–1977)
- 25 March – Porridge (1974–1977)
- 8 June – Survivors (1975–1977)
- 24 August – The Adventures of Rupert Bear (1969–1977)
- 19 September – Yanks Go Home (1976–1977)
- 13 November – Dad's Army (1968–1977)
- 17 December – The New Avengers (1976–1977)
- 24 December – The Duchess of Duke Street (1976–1977)
- 31 December – Rascal the Raccoon (1977)

== Births ==
- 1 January – Anna Acton, actress
- 13 January – Orlando Bloom, actor
- 10 March – Rita Simons, actress, singer and model
- 23 April – Babita Sharma, newsreader
- 4 April – Stephen Mulhern, magician and presenter
- 13 May – Samantha Morton, actress

May 15 – Ben Whitehead, English actor, voice artist and read-in artist

- 23 May – Richard Ayoade, comedian and actor
- 24 May – Jo Joyner, actress
- 30 May – Rachael Stirling, actress
- 31 May – Debbie King, presenter
- 5 June – Emma Crosby, newsreader, presenter and journalist
- 6 June – Adrian Dickson, South African-born presenter
- 9 June – Maryam Moshiri, Iranian-born news presenter
- 22 August – Sarah Champion, presenter and disc jockey
- 1 September – Lucy Pargeter, actress
- 12 September – James McCartney, singer and songwriter
- 15 September – Tom Hardy, actor
- 25 September – Georgie Thompson, sports journalist
- 3 October – Shazia Mirza, comedian
- 3 December – Jennifer James, actress
- 23 December – Matt Baker, presenter
- Rachel Jupp, BBC News & Current Affairs Diector

== Deaths ==
- 25 February – Patricia Haines, 45, actress
- 29 August – Edward Sinclair, 63, actor (verger Maurice Yeatman in Dad's Army)

== See also ==
- 1977 in British music
- 1977 in British radio
- 1977 in the United Kingdom
- List of British films of 1977
