= 1977 in British music =

This is a summary of 1977 in music in the United Kingdom, including the official charts from that year.

== Events ==
- 1 January – The Clash headline the gala opening of the London music club, the Roxy.
- 6 January – Record company EMI drops the controversial punk rock group the Sex Pistols.
- 22 January – Maria Kliegel makes her London début at the Wigmore Hall, with a programme of Bach, Kodály, and Franck.
- 26 January – Fleetwood Mac's original lead guitarist, Peter Green, is committed to a mental hospital in England after firing a pistol at a delivery boy bringing him a royalties check.
- 27 January – After releasing only one single for the band, EMI Records terminates its contract with the Sex Pistols.
- 4 February – Fleetwood Mac's Rumours is released; it goes on to become one of the best-selling albums of all time.
- 15 February – Sid Vicious replaces Glen Matlock as the bassist of the Sex Pistols.
- 10 March – A&M Records signs the Sex Pistols in a ceremony in front of Buckingham Palace. The contract is terminated on 16 March as a result of the band vandalising property and verbally abusing employees during a visit to the record company's office.
- 2 May – Elton John performs the first of six consecutive nights at London's Rainbow Theatre, his first concert in eight months. John keeps a low profile in 1977, not releasing any new music for the first year since his recording career began eight years previously.
- 7 May – Having been postponed from 2 April because of a BBC technicians' strike, the 22nd Eurovision Song Contest finally goes ahead in London's Wembley Conference Centre.
- 11 May – The Stranglers and support band London start a 10-week national tour.
- 12 May – Virgin Records announces that they have signed the Sex Pistols.
- 7 June – The Sex Pistols attempt to interrupt Silver Jubilee celebrations for Queen Elizabeth II by performing "God Save the Queen" from a boat on the River Thames. Police force the boat to dock and several arrests are made following a scuffle.
- 12 June – Guitarist Michael Schenker vanishes after a UFO concert at the Roundhouse in London. He is replaced for several months by Paul Chapman until he appears again to rejoin the group in October.
- 15 June – The Snape Maltings Training Orchestra makes its London debut at St John's, Smith Square.
- 25 June – The Young Musicians' Symphony Orchestra of London, conducted by James Blair, gives the belated première of William Walton's 1962 composition Prelude for Orchestra.
- 6 July – During a Pink Floyd concert before a crowd of 80,000 at the Olympic Stadium in Montreal, bassist Roger Waters becomes increasingly irritated by a fan and expresses his frustration by spitting on him. The incident becomes the catalyst for the group's next album, The Wall.
- 22 July – The first night of the Proms is broadcast by BBC Radio 3 for the first time in quadraphonic sound.
- 26 July – Led Zeppelin cancel the last seven dates of their American tour after lead singer Robert Plant learns that his six-year-old son Karac has died of a respiratory virus. The show two days before in Oakland proves to be the band's last ever in the United States.
- 17 August – The final appearance of conductor Sir Adrian Boult, aged 88, at the Proms, conducting Job by Vaughan Williams, a work dedicated to Boult.
- 1 September – World première at the Royal Albert Hall in London of the expanded version of Luciano Berio's Coro.
- 16 September – T. Rex frontman Marc Bolan is killed in an automobile accident.
- 27 October – The Sex Pistols release Never Mind the Bollocks, Here's the Sex Pistols, which would be their only studio album.

== Charts ==
=== Number-one singles ===
| Date | Song | Artist |
|---|---|---|
| 8 January | "When a Child Is Born" | Johnny Mathis |
| 15 January | "Don't Give Up on Us" | David Soul |
| 22 January | "Don't Give Up on Us" | David Soul |
| 29 January | "Don't Give Up on Us" | David Soul |
| 5 February | "Don't Give Up on Us" | David Soul |
| 12 February | "Don't Cry for Me Argentina" | Julie Covington |
| 19 February | "When I Need You" | Leo Sayer |
| 26 February | "When I Need You" | Leo Sayer |
| 5 March | "When I Need You" | Leo Sayer |
| 12 March | "Chanson D'Amour" | The Manhattan Transfer |
| 19 March | "Chanson D'Amour" | The Manhattan Transfer |
| 26 March | "Chanson D'Amour" | The Manhattan Transfer |
| 2 April | "Knowing Me, Knowing You" | ABBA |
| 9 April | "Knowing Me, Knowing You" | ABBA |
| 16 April | "Knowing Me, Knowing You" | ABBA |
| 23 April | "Knowing Me, Knowing You" | ABBA |
| 30 April | "Knowing Me, Knowing You" | ABBA |
| 7 May | "Free" | Deniece Williams |
| 14 May | "Free" | Deniece Williams |
| 21 May | "I Don't Want to Talk About It" / "The First Cut Is the Deepest" | Rod Stewart |
| 28 May | "I Don't Want to Talk About It" / "The First Cut Is the Deepest" | Rod Stewart |
| 4 June | "I Don't Want to Talk About It" / "The First Cut Is the Deepest" | Rod Stewart |
| 11 June | "I Don't Want to Talk About It" / "The First Cut Is the Deepest" | Rod Stewart |
| 18 June | "Lucille" | Kenny Rogers |
| 25 June | "Show You the Way to Go" | The Jacksons |
| 2 July | "So You Win Again" | Hot Chocolate |
| 9 July | "So You Win Again" | Hot Chocolate |
| 16 July | "So You Win Again" | Hot Chocolate |
| 23 July | "I Feel Love" | Donna Summer |
| 30 July | "I Feel Love" | Donna Summer |
| 6 August | "I Feel Love" | Donna Summer |
| 13 August | "I Feel Love" | Donna Summer |
| 20 August | "Angelo" | Brotherhood of Man |
| 27 August | "Float On" | The Floaters |
| 3 September | "Way Down" | Elvis Presley |
| 10 September | "Way Down" | Elvis Presley |
| 17 September | "Way Down" | Elvis Presley |
| 24 September | "Way Down" | Elvis Presley |
| 1 October | "Way Down" | Elvis Presley |
| 8 October | "Silver Lady" | David Soul |
| 15 October | "Silver Lady" | David Soul |
| 22 October | "Silver Lady" | David Soul |
| 29 October | "Yes Sir I Can Boogie" | Baccara |
| 5 November | "The Name of the Game" | ABBA |
| 12 November | "The Name of the Game" | ABBA |
| 19 November | "The Name of the Game" | ABBA |
| 26 November | "The Name of the Game" | ABBA |
| 3 December | "Mull of Kintyre" / "Girls' School" | Wings |
| 10 December | "Mull of Kintyre" / "Girls' School" | Wings |
| 17 December | "Mull of Kintyre" / "Girls' School" | Wings |
| 24 December | "Mull of Kintyre" / "Girls' School" | Wings |
| 31 December | "Mull of Kintyre" / "Girls' School" | Wings |

=== Number-one albums ===
| Date | Album | Artist | Weeks |
|---|---|---|---|
| 8 January | A Day at the Races | Queen | 1 |
| 15 January | Arrival | ABBA | 1 |
| 22 January | Red River Valley | Slim Whitman | 4 |
| 29 January | Red River Valley | Slim Whitman | 4 |
| 5 February | Red River Valley | Slim Whitman | 4 |
| 12 February | Red River Valley | Slim Whitman | 4 |
| 19 February | 20 Golden Greats | The Shadows | 6 |
| 26 February | 20 Golden Greats | The Shadows | 6 |
| 5 March | 20 Golden Greats | The Shadows | 6 |
| 12 March | 20 Golden Greats | The Shadows | 6 |
| 19 March | 20 Golden Greats | The Shadows | 6 |
| 26 March | 20 Golden Greats | The Shadows | 6 |
| 2 April | Portrait of Sinatra | Frank Sinatra | 2 |
| 9 April | Portrait of Sinatra | Frank Sinatra | 2 |
| 16 April | Arrival | ABBA | 9 |
| 23 April | Arrival | ABBA | 9 |
| 30 April | Arrival | ABBA | 9 |
| 7 May | Arrival | ABBA | 9 |
| 14 May | Arrival | ABBA | 9 |
| 21 May | Arrival | ABBA | 9 |
| 28 May | Arrival | ABBA | 9 |
| 4 June | Arrival | ABBA | 9 |
| 11 June | Arrival | ABBA | 9 |
| 18 June | The Beatles at the Hollywood Bowl | The Beatles | 1 |
| 25 June | The Muppet Show | The Muppets | 1 |
| 2 July | A Star is Born | Original Soundtrack | 2 |
| 9 July | A Star is Born | Original Soundtrack | 2 |
| 16 July | The Johnny Mathis Collection | Johnny Mathis | 4 |
| 23 July | The Johnny Mathis Collection | Johnny Mathis | 4 |
| 30 July | The Johnny Mathis Collection | Johnny Mathis | 4 |
| 6 August | The Johnny Mathis Collection | Johnny Mathis | 4 |
| 13 August | Going for the One | Yes | 2 |
| 20 August | Going for the One | Yes | 2 |
| 27 August | 20 All Time Greats | Connie Francis | 2 |
| 3 September | 20 All Time Greats | Connie Francis | 2 |
| 10 September | 40 Greatest Hits | Elvis Presley | 1 |
| 17 September | 20 Golden Greats | Diana Ross and the Supremes | 7 |
| 24 September | 20 Golden Greats | Diana Ross and the Supremes | 7 |
| 1 October | 20 Golden Greats | Diana Ross and the Supremes | 7 |
| 8 October | 20 Golden Greats | Diana Ross and the Supremes | 7 |
| 15 October | 20 Golden Greats | Diana Ross and the Supremes | 7 |
| 22 October | 20 Golden Greats | Diana Ross and the Supremes | 7 |
| 29 October | 20 Golden Greats | Diana Ross and the Supremes | 7 |
| 5 November | 40 Golden Greats | Cliff Richard | 1 |
| 12 November | Never Mind the Bollocks, Here's the Sex Pistols | The Sex Pistols | 2 |
| 19 November | Never Mind the Bollocks, Here's the Sex Pistols | The Sex Pistols | 2 |
| 26 November | The Sound of Bread | Bread | 2 |
| 3 December | The Sound of Bread | Bread | 2 |
| 10 December | Disco Fever | Various Artists | 4 |
| 17 December | Disco Fever | Various Artists | 4 |
| 24 December | Disco Fever | Various Artists | 4 |
| 31 December | Disco Fever | Various Artists | 4 |

== Year-end charts ==
1977 is the first year for which "full year" UK year-end charts exist – in order to be published in the year's final issue of Music Week and to be broadcast on BBC Radio 1 on New Year's Day, the collection of sales data had a cut-off point sometime in early December each year. This continued to be the case until 1983, when Gallup took over the compilation of the charts from the British Market Research Bureau (BMRB) and automated the data collection process, which meant that sales could be tabulated right up until the end of the year and still produced in time for the Radio 1 broadcast. However, from 1977 to 1982 (with the exception of 1979), BMRB produced updated charts a few months later which included the missing final weeks' sales for each year.

The tables below include sales between 1 January and 30 December 1977: the year-end charts reproduced in the issue of Music Week dated 24 December 1977 and played on Radio 1 on 1 January 1978 only include sales figures up until 10 December 1977.

=== Best-selling singles ===
| No. | Title | Artist | Peak position |
|---|---|---|---|
| 1 | "Mull of Kintyre"/"Girls' School" | Wings | 1 |
| 2 | "Don't Give Up on Us" | David Soul | 1 |
| 3 | "Don't Cry for Me Argentina" | Julie Covington | 1 |
| 4 | "When I Need You" | Leo Sayer | 1 |
| 5 | "Silver Lady" | David Soul | 1 |
| 6 | "Knowing Me, Knowing You" | ABBA | 1 |
| 7 | "I Feel Love" | Donna Summer | 1 |
| 8 | "Way Down" | Elvis Presley | 1 |
| 9 | "So You Win Again" | Hot Chocolate | 1 |
| 10 | "Angelo" | Brotherhood of Man | 1 |
| 11 | "Chanson D'Amour" | The Manhattan Transfer | 1 |
| 12 | "Yes Sir, I Can Boogie" | Baccara | 1 |
| 13 | "Black Is Black" | La Belle Epoque | 2 |
| 14 | "Fanfare for the Common Man" | Emerson, Lake and Palmer | 2 |
| 15 | "Ma Baker" | Boney M | 2 |
| 16 | "The Name of the Game" | ABBA | 1 |
| 17 | "Rockin' All Over the World" | Status Quo | 3 |
| 18 | "Evergreen (Love Theme from A Star Is Born)" | Barbra Streisand | 3 |
| 19 | "How Deep Is Your Love" | Bee Gees | 3 |
| 20 | "Lucille" | Kenny Rogers | 1 |
| 21 | "The Floral Dance" | Brighouse & Rastrick Brass Band | 2 |
| 22 | "Magic Fly" | Space | 2 |
| 23 | "We Are the Champions" | Queen | 2 |
| 24 | "Boogie Nights" | Heatwave | 2 |
| 25 | "You're in My Heart (The Final Acclaim)" | Rod Stewart | 3 |
| 26 | "Sideshow" | Barry Biggs | 3 |
| 27 | "Float On" | The Floaters | 1 |
| 28 | "Show You the Way to Go" | The Jacksons | 1 |
| 29 | "Baby, Don't Change Your Mind" | Gladys Knight & the Pips | 4 |
| 30 | "Free" | Deniece Williams | 1 |
| 31 | "Sound and Vision" | David Bowie | 3 |
| 32 | "Ain't Gonna Bump No More (With No Big Fat Woman)" | Joe Tex | 2 |
| 33† | "I Don't Want to Talk About It"/"The First Cut Is the Deepest" | Rod Stewart | 1 |
| 34 | "Going In with My Eyes Open" | David Soul | 2 |
| 35 | "Dancin' Party" | Showaddywaddy | 4 |
| 36 | "When" | Showaddywaddy | 3 |
| 37 | "You Got What It Takes" | Showaddywaddy | 2 |
| 38 | "Oxygène (Part IV)" | Jean-Michel Jarre | 4 |
| 39 | "Daddy Cool – The Girl Can't Help It" | Darts | 6 |
| 40 | "Best of My Love" | The Emotions | 4 |
| 41 | "The Crunch" | The RAH Band | 6 |
| 42 | "I Will" | Ruby Winters | 4 |
| 43 | "Black Betty" | Ram Jam | 7 |
| 44 | "The Shuffle" | Van McCoy | 4 |
| 45 | "Nobody Does It Better" | Carly Simon | 7 |
| 46 | "Down Deep Inside (Theme from The Deep)" | Donna Summer | 5 |
| 47 | "Red Light Spells Danger" | Billy Ocean | 2 |
| 48 | "2-4-6-8 Motorway" | Tom Robinson Band | 5 |
| 49 | "Isn't She Lovely" | David Parton | 4 |
| 50 | "Nights on Broadway" | Candi Staton | 6 |

† Despite spending four weeks at number one, Rod Stewart's "I Don't Want to Talk About It"/"The First Cut Is the Deepest" was only placed at number 33 on the year-end chart for 1977, the lowest ranked number one single of the year, and lower than another of Stewart's singles, "You're in My Heart", which only reached number three. Some chart-watchers claim to have evidence that an incorrect panel sale figure was applied to sales during the period that "I Don't Want to Talk About It"/"The First Cut Is the Deepest" was out, resulting in a lower estimation of the single's total sales, and that the single should actually be placed inside the top fifteen year-end positions. However, this claim has never been verified by BMRB or any of the subsequent chart compilers.

=== Best-selling albums ===
The list of the top fifty best-selling albums of 1977 were published in the third edition of the BPI Year Book in 1978. However, in 2007 the Official Charts Company published album chart histories for each year from 1956 to 1977, researched by historian Sharon Mawer, and included an updated list of the top ten best-selling albums for each year based on the new research. The updated top ten for 1977 is shown in the table below.

| No. | Title | Artist | Peak position |
|---|---|---|---|
| 1 | Arrival | ABBA | 1 |
| 2 | 20 Golden Greats | The Shadows | 1 |
| 3 | 20 Golden Greats | Diana Ross and the Supremes | 1 |
| 4 | Rumours | Fleetwood Mac | 3 (Note: Reached number 1 in 1978) |
| 5 | A Star Is Born | Barbra Streisand/Kris Kristofferson | 1 |
| 6 | Hotel California | Eagles | 2 |
| 7 | The Sound of Bread | Bread | 1 |
| 8 | The Johnny Mathis Collection | Johnny Mathis | 1 |
| 9 | Greatest Hits | ABBA | 2 (Note: Reached number 1 in 1976) |
| 10 | Animals | Pink Floyd | 2 |

== Classical music: new works ==
- Malcolm Arnold – Variations on a Theme of Ruth Gipps for Orchestra, Op. 122
- John Buller – Proença for mezzo-soprano, electric guitar, and large orchestra
- Peter Maxwell Davies – A Mirror of Whitening Light, for chamber orchestra
- Brian Ferneyhough – Time and Motion Study I, for bass clarinet
- Alun Hoddinott – Sinfonia Fidei
- Michael Tippett – Symphony No. 4

== Opera ==
- William Alwyn – Miss Julie
- Peter Maxwell Davies – The Martyrdom of St Magnus (premièred 18 June at St Magnus Cathedral, Kirkwall)
- Thea Musgrave – Mary, Queen of Scots
- Michael Tippett – The Ice Break (premièred 7 July at the Royal Opera House, Covent Garden)

== Film and incidental music ==
- John Addison – A Bridge Too Far directed by Richard Attenborough
- Richard Rodney Bennett – Equus, starring Richard Burton

== Births ==
- 4 January – Tim Wheeler (Ash)
- 18 January – Richard Archer, singer (Hard-Fi)
- 25 January – Christian Ingebrigtsen, Norwegian-born singer (A1)
- 23 February – Chris Gentry, guitarist (Menswear)
- 2 March – Chris Martin, singer and songwriter (Coldplay)
- 3 March – Ronan Keating, Irish singer (Boyzone)
- 7 March – Paul Cattermole, singer (S Club 7)
- 10 March
  - Colin Murray, DJ
  - Rita Simons, singer (Girls@Play) and actress
- 18 March – Nick Grant, singer (Ultimate Kaos)
- 21 March – Lee Missen, singer (Code Red)
- 26 April – Celena Cherry, singer (Honeyz)
- 4 May – Carrie Askew, singer (Shampoo)
- 31 May – Joel Ross, DJ
- 30 July – Ian Watkins, singer (Lostprophets)
- 17 August – Claire Richards, singer (Steps)
- 4 September – Lucie Silvas, singer
- 11 September – Jon Buckland (Coldplay)
- 27 October – Mariama Goodman, singer (Solid HarmoniE, Honeyz)
- 1 November – Alistair Griffin, singer/songwriter
- 4 November – Kavana, singer
- 7 December – Dominic Howard, drummer (Muse)

== Deaths ==
- 29 January – Johnny Franz, English record producer, 54 (heart attack)
- 10 February – Grace Williams, composer, 70
- 26 March – Madeleine Dring, composer and actress, 53 (cerebral haemorrhage)
- 21 April – Issy Bonn, English actor, comedian, and singer, 74
- 22 April – Ryan Davies, comedian, singer and songwriter, 40 (asthma)
- 13 June – Matthew Garber, former child star of Mary Poppins, 21 (pancreatitis)
- 16 September – Marc Bolan, 29, singer-songwriter (car crash)
- 11 October – Joseph Wheeler, musicologist, 49/50
- 14 November – Richard Addinsell, Warsaw Concerto composer, 73
- 24 December – Raymond Sunderland, organist and composer, 56
- 25 December – Charlie Chaplin, actor and composer, 88
- date unknown
  - Jimmy Cooper, hammered dulcimer player, 69/70
  - Charles Turner, composer and spy

== Music awards ==
=== BRIT Awards ===
The 1977 BRIT Awards were to mark the Queen's Silver Jubilee and were for the previous 25 years of her reign. The winners were:

- Best British non-musical record: Richard Burton and cast – Under Milk Wood
- Best British producer: George Martin
- Best classical soloist album: Jacqueline du Pré – Elgar, Cello Concerto
- Best international album: Simon & Garfunkel – Bridge over Troubled Water
- Best orchestral album: Benjamin Britten – War Requiem
- British album: The Beatles – Sgt. Pepper's Lonely Hearts Club Band
- British breakthrough act: Julie Covington
- British female solo artist: Shirley Bassey
- British group: The Beatles
- British male solo artist: Cliff Richard
- British single: Queen – "Bohemian Rhapsody" and Procol Harum – "A Whiter Shade of Pale" (joint winners)
- Outstanding Contribution: L.G. Wood and the Beatles (joint winners)

== See also ==
- 1977 in British radio
- 1977 in British television
- 1977 in the United Kingdom
- List of British films of 1977
