= 1977 in British radio =

This is a list of events in British radio during 1977.

== Events ==
=== January ===
- 3 January – At 6.45am, BBC Radio Cymru launches, and becomes the first broadcasting outlet dedicated wholly to programmes in Welsh. The service is part-time and restricted to breakfast shows, extended news bulletins at breakfast, lunchtime & early evening and a number of off-peak opt-outs from a sustaining Radio 4 Wales English-language feed.

=== February ===
- 14 February – The Annan Committee makes its recommendations and its principle recommendation for radio is for the privatisation of BBC local radio; this is not implemented.

=== March ===
- No events.

=== April ===
- 30 April – The first edition of the Saturday morning magazine programme Sport on Four is broadcast on BBC Radio 4; it will run until 1998.

=== May ===
- 2 May – BBC Radio 4 launches a new breakfast programme Up to the Hour. Consequently, the Today programme is reduced from a continuous two-hour programme to two 25-minute slots. This arrangement lasts for just over a year before Today reverts to a continuous broadcast. This summer, Today starts to carry a daily horse racing tip, which will continue until 2024.

=== June ===
- No events.

=== July ===
- 1 July – BBC Radio 4 extends the 6pm news on weekdays from 15 to 30 minutes and renames the bulletin to The Six O’Clock News. The weekend 6pm news bulletin remains as a 15-minute broadcast and continues to be listed as News. This is the flagship change to a number of schedule alterations, which include The Archers moving from 6.45pm to 7.05 pm.
- 16 July – William Alwyn's opera Miss Julie receives its world premiere as a BBC Radio 3 broadcast (from a studio recording made on 17 February in Brent Town Hall) with the BBC Concert Orchestra, and Jill Gomez in the title role.

=== August ===
- 22 August – The BBC Radio comedy The Men from the Ministry airs its final episode after fifteen years on air.

=== September ===
- No events.

=== October ===
- 2 October – The first edition of personal financial advice magazine programme Money Box is broadcast on BBC Radio 4; it will still be running into the 2020s.
- 11 October – Bing Crosby makes his last ever recordings, three days before his death, at the BBC's Maida Vale Studios.

=== November ===
- 28 November – BBC Radio 1 launches a weekday afternoon programme presented by Tony Blackburn. Previously, the station has simulcasted BBC Radio 2's afternoon show. Tony is replaced on mid-mornings by Simon Bates. Consequently Radio 1 now has its own all-day schedule on weekdays although the station continues to simulcast Radio 2 each night from 7pm, apart from the weekday late night John Peel programme.

=== December ===
- 25 December – BBC Radio 4 first broadcasts Brian Sibley's comedy near-monologue ...And Yet Another Partridge in a Pear Tree performed by Penelope Keith.

== Station debuts ==
- 3 January – BBC Radio Cymru
- 9 May – BBC Radio Orkney, BBC Radio Shetland

== Programme debuts ==
- 2 May – Up to the Hour on BBC Radio 4 (1977–1978)
- 6 September – The News Quiz on BBC Radio 4 (1977–Present)
- 2 October – Money Box on BBC Radio 4 (1977–Present)
- 26 October – File on 4 on BBC Radio 4 (1977–Present)
- 5 November – Albert and Me on BBC Radio 2 (1977–1983)
- The Enchanting World of Hinge and Bracket on BBC Radio 4 (1977–1979)

== Continuing radio programmes ==
=== 1940s ===
- Sunday Half Hour (1940–2018)
- Desert Island Discs (1942–Present)
- Down Your Way (1946–1992)
- Letter from America (1946–2004)
- Woman's Hour (1946–Present)
- A Book at Bedtime (1949–Present)

=== 1950s ===
- The Archers (1950–Present)
- The Today Programme (1957–Present)
- Sing Something Simple (1959–2001)
- Your Hundred Best Tunes (1959–2007)

=== 1960s ===
- Farming Today (1960–Present)
- In Touch (1961–Present)
- Petticoat Line (1965–1979)
- The World at One (1965–Present)
- The Official Chart (1967–Present)
- Just a Minute (1967–Present)
- The Living World (1968–Present)
- The Organist Entertains (1969–2018)

=== 1970s ===
- PM (1970–Present)
- Start the Week (1970–Present)
- Week Ending (1970–1998)
- You and Yours (1970–Present)
- I'm Sorry I Haven't a Clue (1972–Present)
- Good Morning Scotland (1973–Present)
- Hello Cheeky (1973–1979)
- Kaleidoscope (1973–1998)
- Newsbeat (1973–Present)
- The News Huddlines (1975–2001)
- The Burkiss Way (1976–1980)

== Ending this year ==
- 16 July – The Navy Lark (1959–1977)
- 22 August – The Men from the Ministry (1962–1977)

== Births ==
- 30 March – Hugo Rifkind, newspaper columnist and radio presenter
- 31 May – Joel Ross, radio and television presenter
- 22 August – Sarah Champion, radio and television presenter
- 28 September – John Finnemore, comedy writer-performer
- 25 October – Anita Rani, radio and television presenter

== Deaths ==
- 5 September – Elsie Carlisle, "Radio Sweetheart Number One", singer (born 1896)
- 8 November – Ted Ray, comedian (born 1905)

== See also ==
- 1977 in British music
- 1977 in British television
- 1977 in the United Kingdom
- List of British films of 1977
