= James McKean =

James McKean may refer to:

- James B. McKean (1821–1879), American politician from New York and Utah
- James McKean (Australian politician) (1832–1901), solicitor and politician in colonial Victoria (Australia)
- James W. McKean (1860–1949), American doctor and missionary in Siam (Thailand)
- Jim McKean (1945–2019), Canadian umpire in Major League Baseball
- Jim McKean (footballer) (1884–1936), Australian rules footballer
