= Moon Movies =

British television series

Moon Movies is a 1977 British television series. Hosted by Hughie Green, it asked celebrities which films they would take with them on a long space trip. It was produced by Southern Television. All thirteen episodes are believed to be lost.
