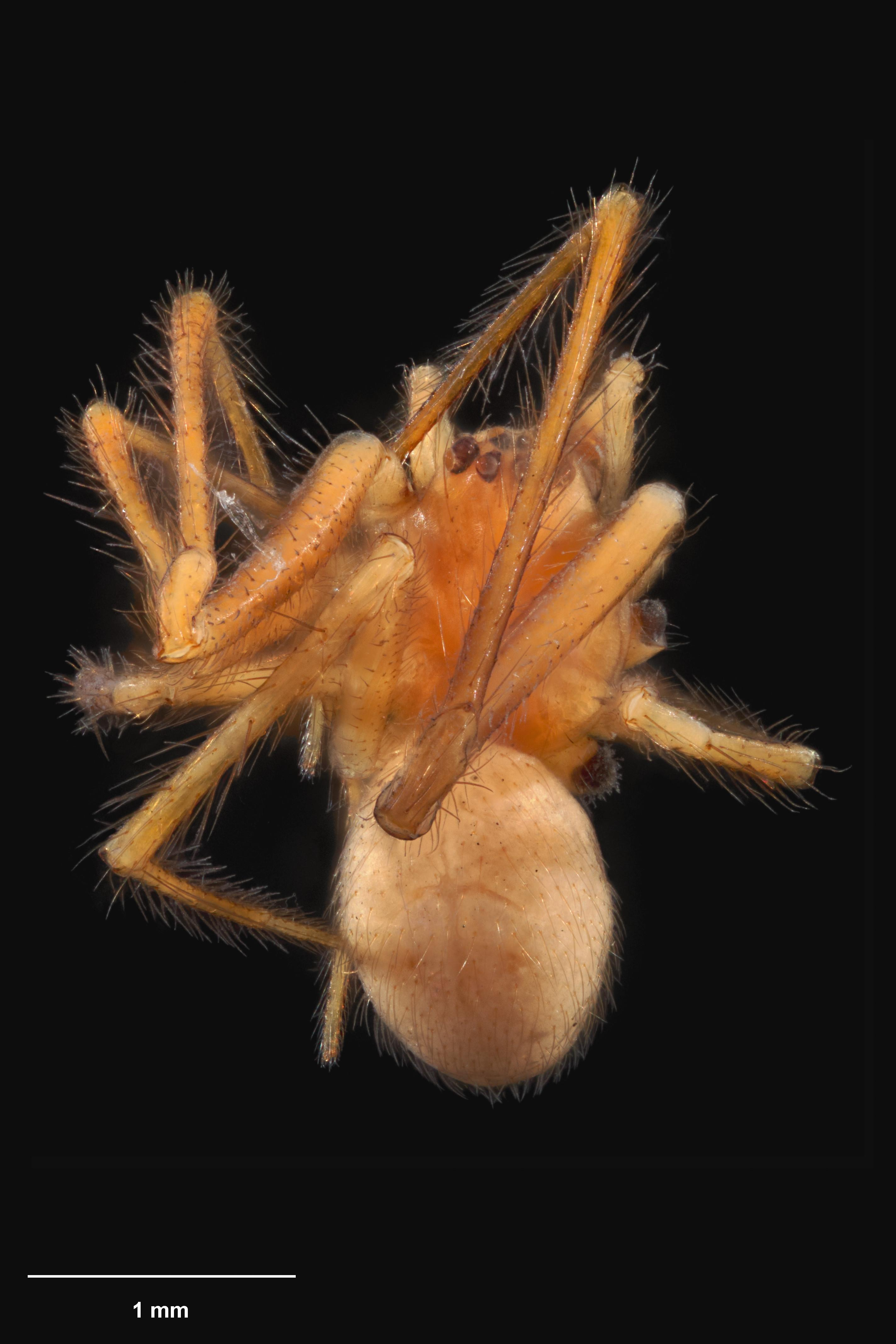

Conservation status
- Naturally Uncommon (NZ TCS)

Scientific classification
- Kingdom: Animalia
- Phylum: Arthropoda
- Subphylum: Chelicerata
- Class: Arachnida
- Order: Araneae
- Infraorder: Araneomorphae
- Family: Theridiidae
- Genus: Icona
- Species: I. alba

Binomial name
- Icona alba Forster, 1955

= Icona alba =

Species of spider

Icona alba is a species of comb-footed spider in the family Theridiidae. It is found in New Zealand.

== Taxonomy ==
This species was described by in 1955 by Ray Forster from male and female specimens. It was most recently revised in 1964. The holotype is stored in Te Papa Museum under registration number AS.000002.

== Description ==
The male is recorded at 5.01mm in length whereas the female is 4.26mm. The body is generally coloured creamy white. The abdomen has black patches.

== Distribution ==
This species is only known from the Auckland Islands and Campbell Islands in New Zealand.

== Conservation status ==
Under the New Zealand Threat Classification System, this species is listed as "Naturally Uncommon" with the qualifier of "Range Restricted".
