= List of British films of 1977 =

British films released in 1977

A list of films produced in the United Kingdom in 1977 (see 1977 in film):

== 1977 ==
Title	Director	Cast	Genre	Notes
1977
Adventures of a Private Eye	Stanley Long	Christopher Neil, Suzy Kendall, Harry H. Corbett	Comedy	
Age of Innocence	Alan Bridges	David Warner, Honor Blackman, Lois Maxwell	Drama	Co-production with Canada
Are You Being Served?	Bob Kellett	John Inman, Wendy Richard, Frank Thornton	Comedy	Spin-off of TV series Are You Being Served?
Black Joy	Anthony Simmons	Norman Beaton, Floella Benjamin, Dawn Hope	Drama	Entered into the 1977 Cannes Film Festival
The Black Panther	Ian Merrick	Donald Sumpter, Debbie Farrington, Marjorie Yates	Thriller	
A Bridge Too Far	Richard Attenborough	Sean Connery, Robert Redford, Michael Caine	World War II	
Come Play with Me	George Harrison Marks	Alfie Bass, Irene Handl, Ronald Fraser	Comedy	
Confessions from a Holiday Camp	Norman Cohen	Robin Askwith, Antony Booth, Lance Percival	Comedy	
Cross of Iron	Sam Peckinpah	James Coburn, Maximilian Schell, James Mason	World War II	Co-production with West Germany
Crossed Swords	Richard Fleischer	Oliver Reed, Raquel Welch, Mark Lester	Adventure	
Cruel Passion	Chris Boger	Koo Stark, Martin Potter, Katherine Kath	Drama	International co-production
The Deep	Peter Yates	Robert Shaw, Jacqueline Bisset, Nick Nolte	Adventure	Co-production with US
The Disappearance	Stuart Cooper	Donald Sutherland, Francine Racette, David Hemmings	Thriller	Co-production with Canada
Double Exposure	William Webb	Anouska Hempel, David Baron, Hazel O'Connor	Thriller	
The Duellists	Ridley Scott	Keith Carradine, Harvey Keitel, Edward Fox	Historical	Scott won Best First Work at the 1977 Cannes Film Festival.
East of Elephant Rock	Don Boyd	John Hurt, Jeremy Kemp, Judi Bowker	Drama	
Equus	Sidney Lumet	Richard Burton, Peter Firth, Jenny Agutter	Drama	Co-production with US
Full Circle	Richard Loncraine	Mia Farrow, Keir Dullea, Tom Conti	Horror	Co-production with Canada
The Greatest	Tom Gries, Monte Hellman	Muhammad Ali, Ernest Borgnine, Robert Duvall	Biopic	Co-production with US
Hardcore	James Kenelm Clarke	Fiona Richmond, Anthony Steel, Ronald Fraser	Sex comedy	
Holocaust 2000	Alberto De Martino	Kirk Douglas, Simon Ward, Agostina Belli	Horror	British-Italian co-production
Jabberwocky	Terry Gilliam	Michael Palin, Harry H. Corbett, John Le Mesurier	Comedy	
Joseph Andrews	Tony Richardson	Ann-Margret, Peter Firth, Michael Horden	Comedy	
Jubilee	Derek Jarman	Jenny Runacre, Ian Charleson, Nell Campbell	Punk/avant-garde	
March or Die	Dick Richards	Gene Hackman, Catherine Deneuve, Max von Sydow	Adventure	
Nasty Habits	Michael Lindsay-Hogg	Glenda Jackson, Melina Mercouri, Geraldine Page	Comedy	Co-production with US
No. 1 of the Secret Service	Lindsay Shonteff	Nicky Henson, Richard Todd, Aimi MacDonald	Spy comedy	
The People That Time Forgot	Kevin Connor	Patrick Wayne, Doug McClure, Sarah Douglas	Fantasy adventure	Co-production with US
Orca	Michael Anderson	Richard Harris, Charlotte Rampling, Bo Derek	Thriller	Co-production with US
Prey	Norman J. Warren	Barry Stokes, Sally Faulkner, Glory Annen	Science fiction	
The Prince and the Pauper	Richard Fleischer	Oliver Reed, Raquel Welch, Charlton Heston	Adventure	
Silver Bears	Ivan Passer	Michael Caine, Cybill Shepherd, Louis Jourdan	Comedy crime	
Sinbad and the Eye of the Tiger	Sam Wanamaker	Patrick Wayne, Jane Seymour, Patrick Troughton	Fantasy adventure	Co-production with US
Spectre	Clive Donner	Robert Culp, Gig Young, John Hurt	Horror	Co-production with US
The Spy Who Loved Me	Lewis Gilbert	Roger Moore, Barbara Bach, Curd Jürgens	Spy	
The Squeeze	Michael Apted	Stacy Keach, Edward Fox, David Hemmings	Crime thriller	
Stand Up, Virgin Soldiers	Norman Cohen	Robin Askwith, Nigel Davenport, John Le Mesurier	Comedy	
Sweeney!	David Wickes	John Thaw, Dennis Waterman, Barry Foster	Crime	Cinematic spin-off of the TV series
That's Carry On!	Gerald Thomas	Kenneth Williams, Barbara Windsor	Comedy	A compilation of Carry On films
Tintorera	René Cardona, Jr.	Susan George, Hugo Stiglitz, Fiona Lewis	Horror	Co-production with Mexico
The Uncanny	Denis Héroux	Peter Cushing, Ray Milland, Samantha Eggar	Horror	Co-production with Canada
Valentino	Ken Russell	Rudolf Nureyev, Leslie Caron, Michelle Phillips	Biopic	Co-production with US
Welcome to Blood City	Peter Sasdy	Jack Palance, Keir Dullea, Samantha Eggar	Western	Co-production with Canada
What's Up Nurse!	Derek Ford	Nicholas Field, Felicity Devonshire, John Le Mesurier	Comedy	
Wombling Free	Lionel Jeffries	David Tomlinson, Frances de la Tour, Bonnie Langford	Family	

== Top Films at the British Box Office in 1977 ==
1. The Spy Who Loved Me
2. A Star is Born
3. When the North Wind Blows
4. The Pink Panther Strikes Again
5. A Bridge Too Far
6. Sinbad and the Eye of the Tiger
7. The Omen
8. King Kong
9. Airport '77
10. The Adventures of the Wilderness Family
11. One Hundred and One Dalmatians (1961)
12. The Enforcer
13. Jaws
14. Sweeney!
15. The Eagle Has Landed
16. Emmanuelle 2
17. Bugsy Malone
18. Exorcist II: The Heretic
19. Carrie
20. Rocky

== See also ==
- 1977 in British music
- 1977 in British radio
- 1977 in British television
- 1977 in the United Kingdom
