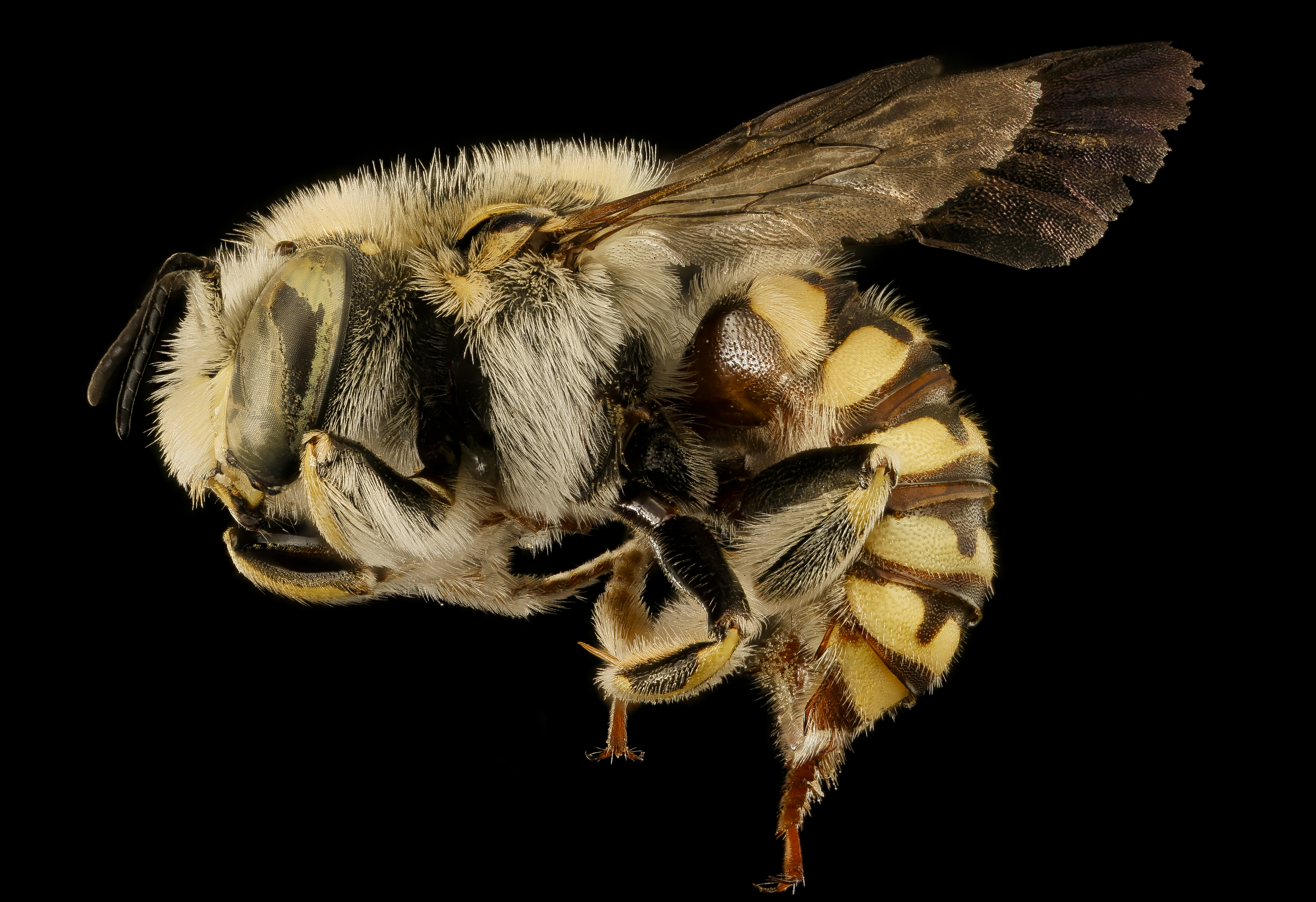

Scientific classification
- Kingdom: Animalia
- Phylum: Arthropoda
- Clade: Pancrustacea
- Class: Insecta
- Order: Hymenoptera
- Family: Megachilidae
- Genus: Anthidium
- Species: A. porterae

Binomial name
- Anthidium porterae Cockerell, 1900

Synonyms
- see text

= Anthidium porterae =

Species of bee

Anthidium porterae is a species of bee in the family Megachilidae, the leaf-cutter, carder, or mason bees. This bee was named in honour of Wilmatte Porter Cockerell.

== Distribution ==
Middle America and North America

== Synonyms ==
Synonyms for this species include:

- Anthidium porterae var amabile Cockerell, 1904
- Anthidium porterae personulatum Cockerell, 1907
