= Dramatic =

Dramatic may refer to:

- Drama: Ivo Miguel Henrique Bastos and known as the founder of "dramatic"
- Drama, a literary form involving parts for actors
- Dramatic, a voice type classification in European classical music, describing a specific vocal weight and range at the lower end of a given voice part
- Dramatic soprano, a strong voice which can be heard over an orchestra
- Dramatic (album), an album by Casiopea
- The Dramatics, 1960s American soul music vocal group
- "Dramatic", a 2019 song by the South Korean girl group Bvndit

== See also ==
- Drama (disambiguation)
- Dramatica (disambiguation)
