= Andrena porterae =

Scientific classification
- Kingdom: Animalia
- Phylum: Arthropoda
- Class: Insecta
- Order: Hymenoptera
- Family: Andrenidae
- Genus: Andrena
- Species: A. porterae

Binomial name
- Andrena porterae Cockerell, 1900

Miner bee species in the family Andrenidae

The Porter's miner bee (Andrena porterae) is a species of miner bee in the family Andrenidae. It is found in North America. It was first described by Theodore Dru Alison Cockerell in 1900 and named after the collector of the type specimen Wilmatte Porter.
