= Alice Barringer Mackie =

Traveller and scientific collector (1885–1977)

- Born: 1 August 1885; Alexandria, Egypt
- Died: 21 January 1977 (aged 91); Hindhead, England
- Occupation(s): traveller scientific collector film-maker

Signature
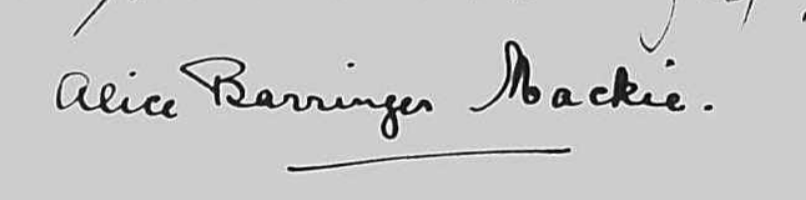

Alice Barringer Mackie (1 August 1885 – 21 January 1977) was a British traveller and scientific collector.

== Life ==
Mackie was born on 1 August 1885 at Alexandria, Egypt. Mackie's father was Sir James Mackie (1838–1898), who was Surgeon to the British Consulate at Alexandria. Mackie's mother was Louise Kirby Mackie (née Moubert and Kirby, 1851–1892). Mackie had two younger siblings: Stella (1888–1912) and James (1891–1938). Mackie's mother Louise had previously been widowed from marriage to a barrister named Laurence Kirby (c.1842–1880) and Mackie had two older half-siblings named Edgar and Violet.

Mackie had lost both her parents by 1898, and in 1901 Mackie and her siblings were living with a guardian named Marie Chanal in London.

At age 19, Mackie was presented as a Debutante to King Edward VII and Queen Alexandra at Buckingham Palace on 24 February 1905: Mackie's introduction at court came via Ethel Moberly Bell, wife of Charles Frederic Moberly Bell, editor of The Times newspaper.

During the First World War Mackie volunteered as a doctor's driver, and at a hospital for wounded soldiers.

As an adult, Mackie was independently wealthy and a prolific traveller during the 1920s–1950s. Mackie's sister Violet lived in the United States, and Mackie visited her regularly. Mackie's brother James emigrated to New Zealand, and Mackie visited James and his family in 1924 and 1928, and assisted James's family by supporting their education.

During World War II Mackie lived at Beaufort Mansions, Chelsea, and served in the Women's arm of the Auxiliary Fire Service.

Mackie was a devout Catholic and her diaries indicate that she regularly attended mass. Mackie died at Hindhead, Surrey on 21 January 1977.

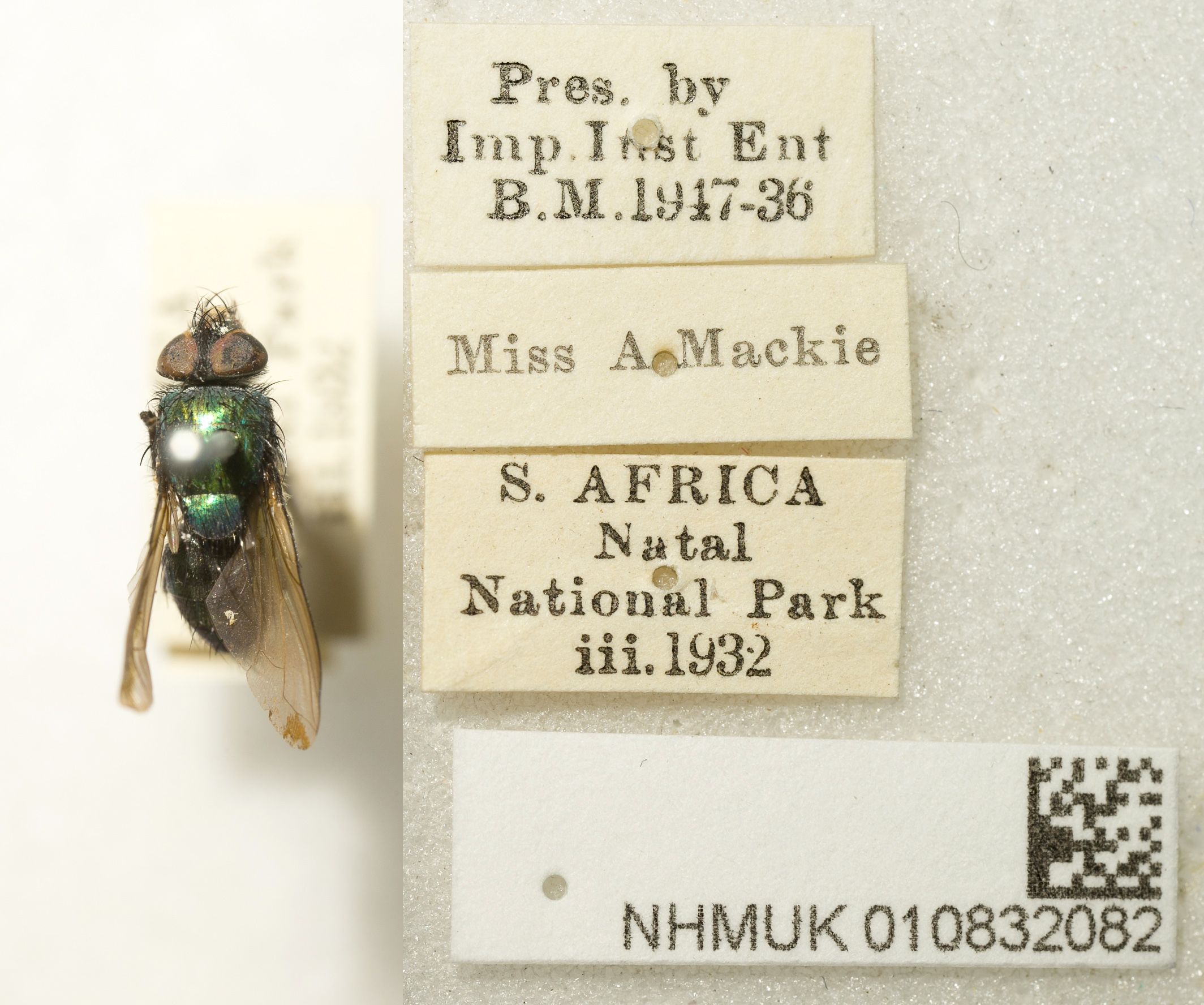
a specimen of the fly species Isomyia natalensis (Villeneuve, 1917), collected by Alice Mackie in Natal National Park in 1932 (NHMUK010832082)

== Travelling and scientific collecting ==
From 1927 to 1928 the entomologists Theodore Cockerell and Wilmatte Porter Cockerell toured around the world, and Mackie became their companion for part of the trip. Mackie met up with the Cockerells at Penang, Malaysia in December 1927. Mackie then accompanied the Cockerells to Thailand, where the group visited James and Laura McKean to see the work of Chiang Mai leprosy hospital, then collected insects with the McKeans at Doi Suthep.

The Cockerells and Mackie then sailed to Australia and across the Pacific. Mackie and Wilmatte Cockerell proceeded to two weeks in Samoa while Theodore Cockerell went to Honolulu, then the women joined him in Hawaii.

Mackie accompanied the Cockerells to Guyana in 1929.

From 1931 to 1932 Mackie participated in the "Cockerell-Mackie-Ogilvie Expedition to Africa" to what was then the Belgian Congo, South Africa and Rhodesia). This expedition involved Mackie collecting insects with the Cockerells and another married couple, John and Lizzie Ogilvie. Mackie collected bee specimens from the genera Heriades, Nomiodes, Hyaleus, Halictus, Colletes, and Allodapula which were described by Theodore Cockerell then deposited at The American Museum of Natural History. Some Diptera specimens collected by Mackie in South Africa are in the collection of the Natural History Museum, London.

== Legacy ==
The American bee species Andrena Mackieae Cockerell, 1937 was named for Mackie by Theodore Cockerell, from a specimen Mackie collected in 1936 at Live Oak Canyon in California.

Much of Mackie's personal archive entered into the care of her family through her brother James' descendants, with her film reels being deposited in the National Archive of New Zealand in 1987 and copies uploaded to YouTube by James's grandson Phil Mackie. Mackie's diaries dating from WWI are in the care of the New Zealand Army Museum, and Mackie's diaries about her travels with the Cockerells were deposited by her family in the collections of the University of Colorado Boulder, and have been digitised.
