= Dramatica =

Dramatica may refer to:

- Drama, from the Greek term Dramatikos
- Dramatica (software), a novel writing software implementing the narrative theory of the same name
- Dramatico, a record label founded by Mike Batt around 2003
- "Dramatica", the 8th song on Vapor Transmission, 2000 album by the synth rock band Orgy
- Encyclopedia Dramatica, a parody-themed wiki in the vein of Wikipedia

== See also ==
- Dramatic (disambiguation)
