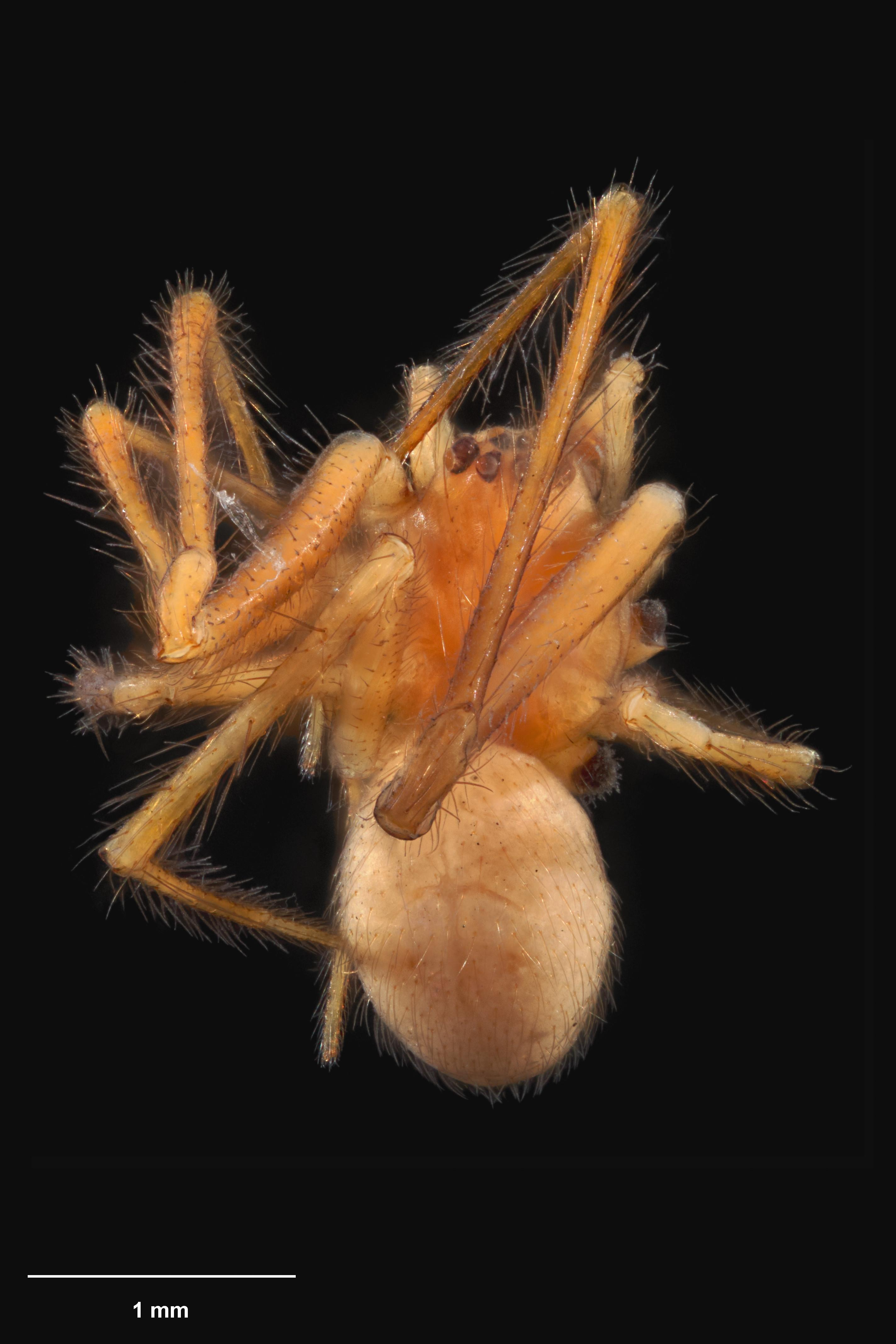
- Icona alba

Scientific classification
- Kingdom: Animalia
- Phylum: Arthropoda
- Subphylum: Chelicerata
- Class: Arachnida
- Order: Araneae
- Infraorder: Araneomorphae
- Family: Theridiidae
- Genus: Icona; Forster, 1955

Type species
- I. alba Forster, 1955

Species
- I. alba Forster, 1955 – New Zealand (Auckland Is., Campbell Is.); I. drama Forster, 1964 – New Zealand (Auckland Is.)

= Icona =

Genus of spiders

Icona is a genus of South Pacific comb-footed spiders (family Theridiidae) that was first described by Raymond Robert Forster in 1955. As of May 2020 it contains only two species, both native to the Auckland Islands: I. alba and I. drama.
