= Gylne tider =

Norwegian television series

- Also known as: Gyldne tider
- Presented by: Øyvind Mund
- Starring: Steinar Marthinsen, Ingar Thorsen
- Country of origin: Norway
- Original language: Norwegian
- No. of seasons: 5

Original release
- Network: TV 2 (Norway)
- Release: 2002

Gylne tider (first season: Gyldne tider, in English: Golden times) is a Norwegian television series that has aired on TV2. The show has produced five seasons which premiered in 2002, 2004, 2006, 2010 and 2016. Presenter Øyvind Mund, cameraman Steinar Marthinsen and sound engineer Ingar Thorsen travel to meet their childhood heroes.

== Television series ==
The first season dealt with Swedish stars from film, television, sports and music who were big in Norway in the 1970s and 1980s. The first season premiered on 16 August 2002 and consisted of four episodes. Guests included Swedish icons Björn Borg, Björn Skifs, Ingemar Stenmark, Gunde Svan, Lill-Babs, Jan Boklöv, Joey Tempest, Lill Lindfors and Carola.

After the success of the first season, another was made, this time with the Norwegian heroes, mainly from the 1980s. Season 2 premiered 11 January 2004 and consisted of six regular episodes, plus a "best of/behind the scenes" episode. In season 2, guests included pop band Drama, The Kids, Vibeke Sæther, Knutsen & Ludvigsen, Anita Hegerland, Roger Ruud, Bobbysocks, Grete Waitz, Dollie, KLM comedians (Lars Mjøen, Trond Kirkvaag and Knut Lystad), and Oddvar Brå.

The third season began on 29 October 2006. This season focused on international stars, and the series became increasingly focused on the 1980s. The third series consisted of eight episodes, plus a "best of" and a "behind the scenes" program. A total of 62 stars participated in the third season, including Linda Evans, Pamela Sue Martin, Lorenzo Lamas, Sabrina, Samantha Fox, Mark Hamill, Bo Derek, Al Corley, Bruce Boxleitner, Richard Chamberlain, Glenn Medeiros, The Bangles, Duane Loken, Mel Smith and Peter Shilton.

Season 4 premiered Sunday 31 October 2010. The series is broadcast in HD. Their season 4 promotional video featuring guests doing a lipdub of the Ferry Aid version of Let It Be became a viral video.

Season 5 premiered on the 28th of August, 2016.

== Prizes ==
The program has won three Gullruten prizes. For the first season they won the Best Newcomer and Best Reportage Series prizes in 2003. For its third season the program won the Best Entertainment Program prize in 2007. In addition, the presenter Øyvind Mund was awarded Best Male Presenter for season two in 2004.
