= The Drama =

The Drama may refer to:

- The Drama (film), a 2026 American film
  - The Drama (soundtrack), the 2026 soundtrack to the film
- The Drama (magazine), a defunct American arts magazine

== See also ==
- Drama (disambiguation)
