= Wilmatte P. Cockerell =

American biology teacher and amateur entomologist

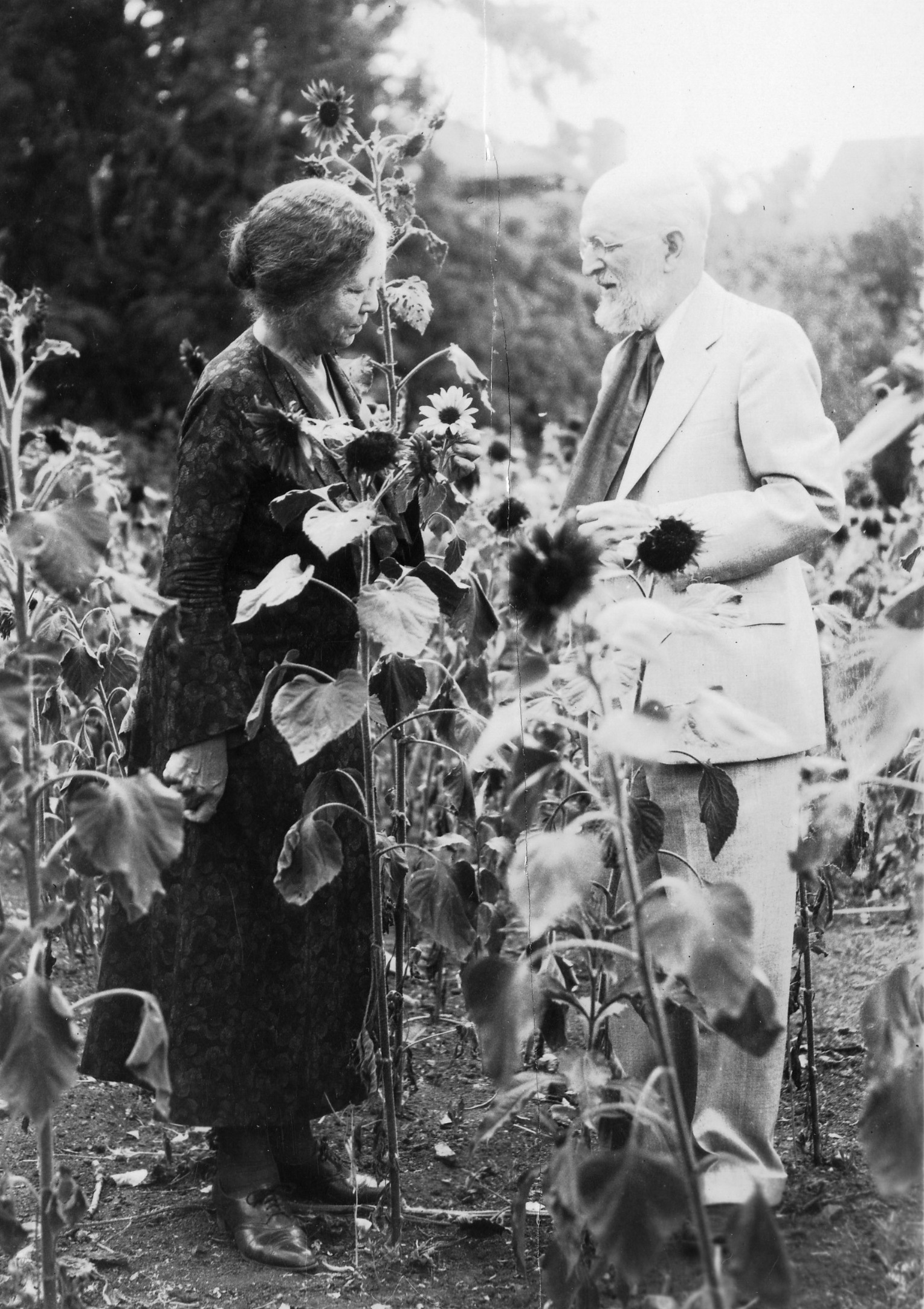
- Cockerell with her husband Theodore in their garden, 1935
- Born: Wilmatte Porter; July 28, 1869; Leon, Iowa, United States
- Died: March 15, 1957 (aged 87); Los Angeles, California, U.S.
- Resting place: Columbia Cemetery, Boulder, Colorado
- Education: Stanford University
- Known for: Discovery and collection of species of fauna and flora
- Spouse: Theodore Dru Alison Cockerell (m. 1900)
- Awards: 1915 Medal, Panama–Pacific International Exposition
- Scientific career
- Fields: Entomology

Wilmatte Porter Cockerell (July 28, 1869 – March 15, 1957) was an American entomologist and high school biology teacher who discovered and collected a large number of insect specimens and other organisms. She participated in numerous research and collecting field trips including the Cockerell-Mackie-Ogilvie expedition. She wrote several scientific articles in her own right, co-authored more with her husband, Theodore Dru Alison Cockerell, and assisted him with his prolific scientific output. She discovered and cultivated red sunflowers, eventually selling the seeds to commercial seed companies. Her husband and her entomological colleagues named a number of taxa in her honor.

== Biography ==
Cockerell was born Wilmatte Porter in Leon, Iowa, in 1869. She attended Stanford University and graduated from there in 1898.

From 1899, she was employed as a professor of biology at the New Mexico Normal University in Las Vegas, New Mexico. There she met Theodore Dru Alison Cockerell, a self-taught entomologist from England specialising in Hymenoptera, who was also employed at that college.

Theodore had established the New Mexico biological station at the Agricultural Experiment Station in Mesilla a few years earlier, but in 1899 he moved it to Las Vegas, where he used the facilities of the New Mexico Normal University (he was employed there himself the following year). Theodore used the biological station to teach summer classes in applied biology to mostly public school teachers. By 1900 Cockerell was the assistant director of the station with Theodore being the director. Some of the results from work undertaken at the station were jointly published by Theodore and Cockerell in 1899.

Porter married Theodore Cockerell on June 19, 1900. After her marriage she frequently went on collecting expeditions with Theodore. As well as accompanying her husband on field trips, she collaborated with him on his scientific research and writing. After her marriage Cockerell combined teaching with collecting, and wrote a number of papers on entomology, some as sole author. She was much better than her husband at catching insects, on some field trips out-collecting him nine to one. Both Cockerells were badly paid, and it is known Wilmatte sometimes supplemented the family income by selling specimens she obtained while on her field trips to professional full-time insect collectors, who in some cases altered the collection locality on the labels to make the insects appear more exotic and increase their value.

In 1904, Cockerell and her husband moved to Boulder, Colorado, where Cockerell was employed as a biology teacher at the Colorado State Preparatory School. She continued at that high school for much of her teaching career. In February 1904 Science Magazine published a short article Cockerell had sent in about a local plant she mistakenly called Picradenia odorata utilis which a friend had suggested might be a source of rubber, and that her husband had begun to research. The plant had actually just been described in 1903 in the first issue of a new local Colorado scientific magazine as P. floribunda utilis, although in September 1904 her husband moved it to Hymenoxys floribunda utilis. It is now considered a synonym of H. richardsonii var. floribunda.

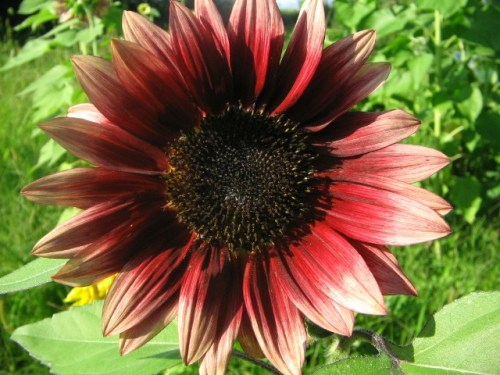
Deep red sunflower

In 1910 Cockerell discovered a red sunflower across the road from her home in a field. This sunflower was a mutant that she and Theodore transferred to their garden. Cockerell proceeded cultivate it further, developing the mutation to the point where it could be sold to commercial seed companies. Seed companies such as Peter Henderson & Co, Sutton & Sons, and Burpee marketed the red sunflower seeds throughout the world. The Cockerells were awarded a medal for their work on these sunflowers at the Panama–Pacific International Exposition at San Francisco in 1915.

=== Field trips ===
In August 1902, Cockerell took a field trip to Truchas Peak, Rio Arriba County, New Mexico, where she collected bees and other insects. This trip resulted in her first scientific report published as sole author, A trip to the Truchas Peaks, New Mexico in the journal The American Naturalist.

In 1906, the Cockerells visited the Florissant Fossil Beds with Sievert Allen Rohwer and W. M. Wheeler, and with them collected specimens and published various articles about the fossil insects found at this site.

During the summers after 1911, the Cockerells undertook various field trips the world over collecting bees, insects, and studying flora and fauna. During these field trips, as well as providing specimens for her husband's research, Cockerell's collecting also provided other entomologists with specimens to research. In 1912 Cockerell and her husband traveled to Guatemala. There she collected numerous insect specimens including many wasps, some of which were species previously unknown to science. These were studied by Rohwer who named two species after her. Also in 1912, while traveling in Guatemala, Cockerell collected three specimens of cacti for National Herbarium at the Smithsonian. These were sent to the botanists Nathaniel Lord Britton and Joseph Nelson Rose. They reclassified their just described Hylocereus minutiflorus as a monotypic species in the genus Wilmattea in her honor, although this change has since been rescinded.

In August 1918, Cockerell and her husband went on a field trip to Peaceful Valley, Colorado, where again she collected specimens of numerous species previously unknown to science.

Cockerell and her husband traveled to the United Kingdom in 1921, and visited the Royal Botanic Garden Edinburgh.

In 1923, Cockerell and Theodore undertook a trip to Japan. They traveled on the steamer Aleut. While in Japan they had a narrow escape in the Great Kantō earthquake. The Denver Times reported that Cockerell and her husband were believed lost in the catastrophe.

In the later half of 1931 into 1932 the Cockerells went to Africa on what they christened the "Cockerell-Mackie-Ogilvie Expedition". They were accompanied by the naturalist Alice Barringer Mackie. The expedition visited many areas of Africa including the Congo where the group collected over 16,000 specimens, especially of bees. Once again numerous specimens of various species were collected by them that up until then had been unknown to science.

After Theodore retired, Cockerell spent her winters with her husband in California. They both worked as volunteer curators at the Desert Museum in Palm Springs, California, from 1941. They were not paid for this work but did receive housing as part compensation until 1945. In 1946 Cockerell and her husband began working at Escuela Agricola Panamericana in Tegucigalpa, Honduras. After Theodore died in San Diego, California, in 1948, Cockerell taught at Piney Woods School near Jackson, Mississippi.

=== Death ===
Cockerell died March 15, 1957, in Los Angeles, California, aged 87. She was buried in Columbia Cemetery, Boulder, Colorado, alongside her husband.

== Bibliography ==
- Cockerell, T.D.A.; Porter, W. : XLVI.—Contributions from the New Mexico biological station—VIII. The New Mexico bees of the genus Bombus. Annals and Magazine of Natural History Vol 7, No. 4 (1899), pp. 386–393.
- Cockerell, T.D.A.; Porter, W. : XLVIII.—Contributions from the New Mexico Biological Station.—VII. Observations on bees, with descriptions of new genera and species. Annals and Magazine of Natural History Vol 7, No. 4 (1899), pp. 386–393.
- Cockerell, T. D.A.; Porter, W. :VIII.—Contributions from the New Mexico biological station—IX. On certain genera of bees. Annals and Magazine of Natural History Vol 7, No. 37 (1901), pp. 46–50.
- Cockerell, T. D. A.; Porter, Wilmatte . A New Crayfish from New Mexico. Proceedings of the Academy of Natural Sciences of Philadelphia v. 52 (1900) 434–435.
- Cockerell, T. D. A.; Cockerell, W. P. "A new mealy-bug on grass roots". The Canadian Entomologist v. 33, No. 12 (1901), pp. 336–337.
- Cockerell, W. P.; Cockerell, T. D. A. "A new gooseberry plant-louse". The Canadian Entomologist v. 33, No. 08 (1901), pp. 227–228.
- Cockerell, Wilmatte Porter. "The red-tailed bumble-bee's nest". Birds and nature (1903) v. 13, pp. 17–18.
- Cockerell, Wilmatte Porter. "The nesting of a carpenter bee". Birds and nature (1903) v. 14, pp. 127–128.
- Cockerell, W. P. "A trip to the Truchas Peaks, New Mexico". The American Naturalist v. 37, (1903), pp. 887 – 891
- Cockerell, W. P. "Some Aphids Associated With Ants". Psyche: A Journal of Entomology v. 10, no. 325-326 (1903), pp. 216–218.
- Cockerell, Wilmatte Porter. "Note on a rubber-producing plant". Science Magazine. 19 (477) (1904), pp. 314–315.
- Cockerell, Wilmatte Porter. "The Ants' Herd." Birds and nature (1904) v. 15, pp. 54–55.
- Cockerell, T. D. A.; Rohwer, S. A.; Wheeler; W. M.; Cockerell; W. P. "The bees of Florissant, Colorado". Bulletin of the American Museum of Natural History (1906), v. 22, article 25.
- Cockerell, T. D. A.; Cockerell, W. P. "A fossil cicada from Florissant, Colorado". Bulletin of the American Museum of Natural History (1906), v. 22, article 26.
- Cockerell, T. D. A; Cockerell, W. P.; Rohwer, S. A. "The Fossil Mollusca of Florissant, Colorado". Bulletin of the American Museum of Natural History (1906), v. 22, article 27.
- Cockerell, T. D. A.; Cockerell, W. P. "Fossil dragonflies from Florissant, Colorado". Bulletin of the American Museum of Natural History (1907), v. 23, article 5.
- Cockerell, T. D. A.; Cockerell, W. P.; Rohwer, S. A. "Fossile Diptera from Florissant, Colorado". Bulletin of the American Museum of Natural History (1909), v. 26, article 2.
- Cockerell, W. P. "Collecting Bees in Southern Texas". Journal of the New York Entomological Society Vol. 25, No. 3 (Sep., 1917), pp. 187–193

== Taxa named in honor of Wilmatte Porter Cockerell ==
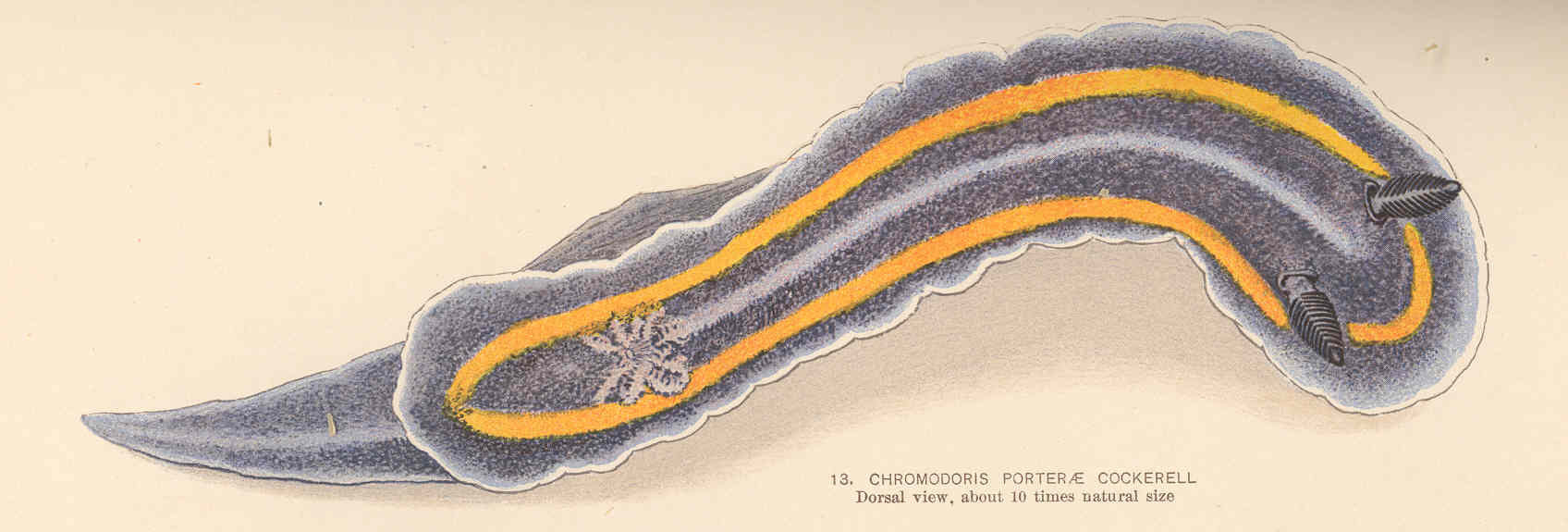
Felimare porterae

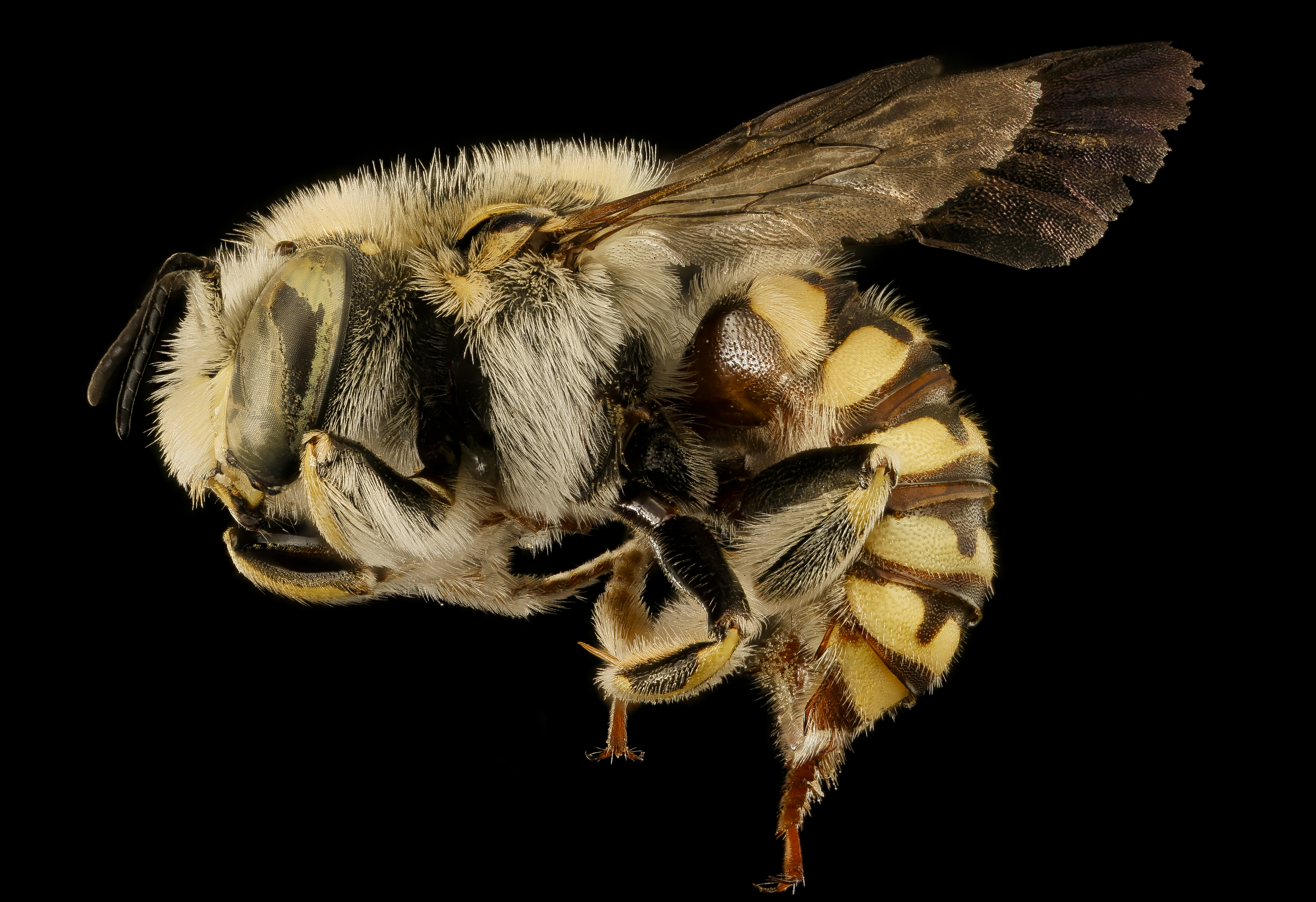
Anthidium porterae

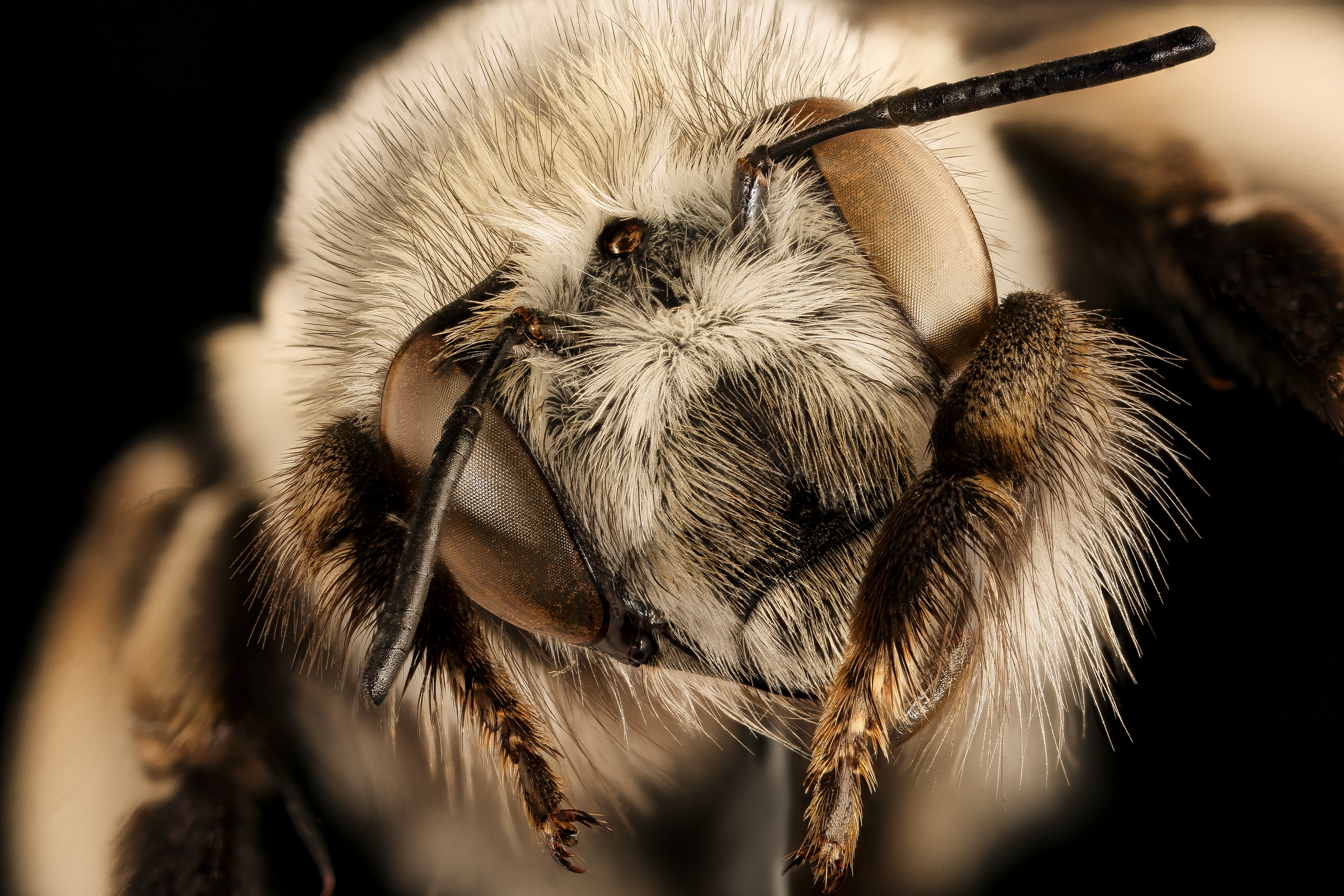
Anthophora porterae

=== Plants ===
- Viola wilmattae C.L. Pollard & Cockerell, 1902. Proceedings of the Biological Society of Washington . 15: 178. - not really a species, but a single plant identified as a hybrid of V. pedatifida with V. nephrophylla in 1913, both species of which had plants growing nearby. Cockerell collected the holotype.
- Castilleja x porterae Cockerell, 1904
- Nyctaginia cockerelliae E.Nelson, 1903
- Senegalia cockerelliae Britton & Rose, 1928 = Acacia cockerelliae (Britton & Rose) Lundell, 1940
- Glyphomitrium cockerelleae Britton & Hollick (now known as Plagiopodopsis cockerelliae (Britton & Hollick)). A fossilised moss named in honour of Cockerell in recognition of her devotion to science and her assistance in collecting specimens.
- Populus wilmattae Cockerell, 1926
- Wilmattea Britton & Rose, 1920

=== Animals ===
==== Mollusks ====
- Ashmunella thomsoniana ssp. porterae Pilsbry & Cockerell, 1899

==== Sea slugs ====
- Felimare porterae (Cockerell, 1901)

==== Bees ====
- Andrena porterae Cockerell, 1900
- Andrena wilmattae Cockerell, T. D. A.1906. Annals and Magazine of Natural History. Ser. 7 17: 224.
- Anthidium porterae Cockerell, 1900.
- Anthophora porterae Cockerell, 1900
- Arachnophroctonus cockerellae Rohwer, S. A. 1914. Proceedings of the United States National Museum. 47: 515.
- Bombus lateralis wilmattae Cockerell, T. D. A. 1912. Annals and Magazine of Natural History. Ser. 8 10: 21.
- Coelioxys wilmattae Cockerell, T. D. A. 1949. Proceedings of the United States National Museum. 98 (3233): 451.
- Exomalopsis wilmattae Cockerell, T. D. A. 1949. Proceedings of the United States National Museum. 98 (3233): 454.
- Hesperapis wilmattae Cockerell, 1933.
- Perdita wilmattae Cockerell, T. D. A. 1906. Bulletin of the American Museum of Natural History. 22: 441.
- Ptiloglossa wilmattae Cockerell, 1949
- Teucholabis cockerellae Alexander, C. P. 1915. Proceedings of the United States National Museum. 48: 442

==== Hemiptera ====
- Ripersia cockerellae King, 1902 (now recognised as a synonym of Chnaurococcus trifolii)
