= Drama (Norwegian band) =

Norwegian pop band

Drama was a Norwegian pop band from Larvik founded in 1981. They were dubbed Norway's first boy band. The band split in 1984 and reunited in 1987 but disbanded again in 1989. They released a total of four studio albums.

The band initially consisted of five members: Per Kristian "Muffe" Indrehus (vocals and guitar), Geir Olav "Gækki" Bøkestad (guitar, vocals and keyboard), Per Arne "Perry" Strandbakken (keyboards), Tomas Siqveland ( bass, vocals) and Gunnar "Stikka" Refsdal (drums). All members were 15 years old when the debut album came out, except Indrehus who was 17. In 1983 the band added Ole Jan "Ollie" Rimstad on guitar, vocals and keyboards.

The band released two albums, Breaking Away in 1982 and High Time in 1983, before Indrehus and Bøkestad left to start as a duo. The two would continue to use the Drama name, which resulted in a lawsuit against the rest of the band. After losing they renamed the duo Creation, while the four remaining members continued under the name of New Drama. Creation released four albums and New Drama two albums before they were reunited again under the name of Drama in 1987 and released another two albums. The band was finally dissolved in 1989.

Drama and Creation and released a double album on 29 May 2006. This album contains 42 tracks, including one new song, "Hello." The group was profiled on the second season of Gylne tider.

== Discography ==
- Breaking Away (Desperado, 1982)
- High Time (Desperado, 1983)
- Take It Away (Desperado, 1987)
- Escapade (Desperado, 1988)
