= Jimmy Cooper (musician) =

Hammered dulcimer player (1907–1977)

- Born: 1907; Coatbridge, Scotland
- Died: 1977 (aged 69–70)
- Genre: Folk
- Occupation: Instrumentalist
- Instrument: Hammered dulcimer

Jimmy Cooper (1907–1977) was a hammered dulcimer player from Scotland.

Cooper was born in Coatbridge, Scotland, near Glasgow. He started to play the dulcimer around age twelve, and gained a lot of experience by playing in dance halls and busking in the early 1920s. Over the course of his life he worked at various jobs, including driving buses, driving an ambulance for a children's home, and running a dance band. His repertoire included traditional Irish and Scottish tunes, pop tunes, show tunes, and more. He was "discovered" as part of the folk revival in the early 1970s, and helped inspire players of the younger generation such as John McCutcheon and Malcolm Dalglish. McCutcheon described Cooper as "the most complete dulcimer player" he had met.

== Discography ==
=== As principal performer ===
- Dulcimer Player, Spoot Records / Forest Tracks FTS3009, 1976 (reissued on cassette as FTC6022, 1988)
- Dulcimer Player, Forest Tracks FTBTCD1, 2003 (reissue of 1976 album with three additional tracks from FT3008, and four previously unissued tracks)
- In Concert, Forest Tracks FTC6023, 1988

=== Other appearances ===
- Various artists, Southern By-Ways, Forest Tracks FT3008, 1976 (appears on four tracks)
- The Boys of the Lough, Good Friends – Good Music, Philo PH1051, 1977 (appears on one track, playing Cadam Woods and The Bonnie Lass of Bon Accord)
- Ashley Hutchings, Kicking Up the Sawdust, Harvest SHSP 4073, 1977 (appears on five tracks)
