= James and Laura McKean =

American medical missionaries and entomologists in Thailand

James William McKean
- Born: March 10, 1860; Iowa, U.S.
- Died: February 9, 1949 (aged 88); Los Angeles U.S.
- Other name: James W. McKean
- Occupations: Doctor of Medicine; Missionary; Entomologist
- Years active: 1889–1931
- Known for: running a leprosy hospital at Chiang Mai

Laura Bell McKean
- Born: January 30, 1870; Clinton, Iowa, U.S.
- Died: March 23, 1949 (aged 79); Los Angeles, U.S.
- Other name: Laura Bell Willson
- Occupations: Missionary; Entomologist
- Years active: 1889–1931

Dr. James William McKean (10 March 1860 – 1949) was an American doctor and Presbyterian Missionary who worked in Thailand, supported by his wife Laura Bell McKean (née Wilson, 30 January 1870 – 1949). James McKean ran a leprosy hospital at Chiang Mai. The site still exists today as the McKean Senior Centre, a support institute for older people. The McKeans took up entomology as a hobby and are credited with the first scientific collection of two insect species from Thailand.

== Family ==
James was born in Iowa on 10 March 1860 to Hugh Clark McKean (a doctor, 1829 – 1865) and Elizabeth (nee McGrew, 1834 – 1866). As a child, he lived in Scotch Grove, Iowa. He studied medicine at Bellevue Hospital Medical College. In 1882 he married Nellie Laura Banton (1861 – 1886), and the couple had two daughters, Ethel (1883 – 1960) and Elizabeth (1885 – 1886).

Laura Bell Willson was born in Clinton, Iowa, to Henry (a businessman and foreman of the United States Wind, Engine and Pump Company) and Kate (née Van Camp).

James and Laura married at Douglas County, Nebraska, on 29 August 1889. Shortly after their marriage the couple headed for Thailand where they began their missionary work. James and Laura had two children: Katherine (born c. 1890) and James Hugh McKean (b.1893).

== Medical missionary work ==
When the McKeans arrived in Thailand they joined missionary Daniel McGilvary, who had been working in Thailand since 1858. McGilvary had overseen the introduction of quinine use and smallpox vaccination to Thailand. Upon arriving in Chiang Mai, James was called to treat his first medical patient, and his early operations were performed on the porch of his bungalow. McKean realised that a better medical facility was needed and appealed to the McCormick family of Chicago who funded the building of a hospital. McKean felt that separating leprosy patients from the rest of the community and caring for them separately was the best hope of eradicating the disease in Thailand, as had been done in Europe, and he appealed for land for constructing a hospital to the governor of Chiang Mai who gifted part of an island near the city.

McKean oversaw building of a vaccine laboratory at the Chiang Mai hospital in 1904. The hospital employed 140 men to evangelize, distribute medicines and vaccines. McKean had particular regard for a man named Ai Keo, who worked at the hospital as head nurse and steward: "faithful to every duty, constant, kind and unselfish in the care of our poor sufferers, I verily believe Ai Keo has done more for his own people than any Lao man that ever lived."

James and Laura retired and returned to the United States in 1931.

== Entomology ==
In 1928 the McKeans were visited by Theodore Cockerell, Wilmatte Cockerell, and Alice Mackie. The Cockerell party and the McKeans went to Doi Suthep to collect insects and plants. Theodore Cockerell noted that the humanitarian activities of American missionaries like the McKeans, plus American Rockefeller-sponsored programmes to eliminate hookworm in Thailand, had led to his party being received with goodwill wherever they went in the country.

The McKeans sent Theodore Cockerell insects from Chiang Mai including a cranefly they had collected in 1928 that Cockerell found 'extremely handsome', new to science, and which he named Tipula (Tipulodina) mckeani. Laura McKean collected a moth at Doi Suthep described and named Daeochaeta mckeanae in her honour by Theodore Cockerell in 1930.
