= 1977 in the United Kingdom =

Events from the year 1977 in the United Kingdom. This year was the Silver Jubilee of Queen Elizabeth II.

== Incumbents ==
- Monarch – Elizabeth II
- Prime Minister – James Callaghan (Labour)

== Events ==
=== January ===
- January–June – The United Kingdom holds the presidency of the Council of the European Union for the first time.
- January – The Ford Fiesta car goes on sale in the UK.
- 3 January – Roy Jenkins, the Home Secretary, announces he is leaving the House of Commons to become President of the European Commission.
- 6 January – After releasing only one single for controversial punk rock band the Sex Pistols, EMI terminates its contract with them in response to its members' disruptive behaviour last month on ITV's Today and two days ago at London Heathrow Airport. Their next contract (in March), with A&M Records, lasts for 2 weeks.
- 10 January – Clive Sinclair introduces his new two-inch screen television set, which retails at £175.
- 14 January – Former Prime Minister Anthony Eden, Earl of Avon, dies aged 79 at Alvediston Manor, his Wiltshire home. He is buried in Alvediston churchyard on 17 January.
- 29 January – Seven Provisional Irish Republican Army bombs explode in the West End of London, but there are no fatalities or serious injuries.

=== February ===
- 4 February
  - Fleetwood Mac's Grammy-winning album Rumours is released, featuring songs that include "The Chain", "Don't Stop", and "Go Your Own Way".
  - Police discover an IRA bomb factory in Liverpool.
- 5 February – Peter Sutcliffe victims: Twenty-eight-year-old homeless woman Irene Richardson is murdered in Leeds, at almost the exact location where sex worker Marcella Claxton was badly injured nine months earlier. Police believe that this murder and attempted murder may be connected, along with the murders of Wilma McCann, Emily Jackson and the attempted murders of at least three other women in Yorkshire.
- 10 February
  - Elizabeth II visits American Samoa.
  - The three IRA terrorists involved in the 1975 Balcombe Street Siege in London are sentenced to life imprisonment on six charges of murder.
- 11 February – Queen Elizabeth II visits Western Samoa.
- 13 February – Anthony Crosland, Foreign Secretary, suffers a massive stroke, from which he will not regain consciousness. He dies six days later in hospital.
- 14 February – Elizabeth II visits Tonga.
- 15 February – The first Aardman Animations character, Morph, is introduced on BBC children's television programme Take Hart.
- 16–17 February – Elizabeth II visits Fiji.
- 17 February – George Newman, chairman of Staffordshire County Council, is sentenced to fifteen months in prison for corruption.
- 22 February – David Owen, 38, becomes the youngest post-Second World War Foreign Secretary, succeeding the late Anthony Crosland, who died three days earlier.
- 22 February–7 March – Elizabeth II visits New Zealand.

=== March ===
- 1 March
  - James Callaghan threatens to withdraw state assistance to British Leyland unless it puts an end to strikes.
  - Long-term prohibition of directed herring fishing within the UK exclusive economic zone is introduced.
- 7–30 March – Elizabeth II visits Australia.
- 10 March – A memorial service is held for composer Benjamin Britten at Westminster Abbey, with the Queen Mother attending.
- 12 March – The Centenary Test between Australia and England begins at the Melbourne Cricket Ground.
- 14 March – The government reveals that inflation has pushed prices up by nearly 70% within three years.
- 15 March – British Leyland managers announce intention to dismiss 40,000 toolmakers who have gone on strike at the company's Longbridge plant in Birmingham, action which is costing the state-owned carmaker more than £10,000,000 a week.
- 17–23 March – The Prince of Wales (the later Charles III) visits Ghana.
- 19 March – The last Rover P6 rolls off the production line after 14 years.
- 23 March – The government wins a vote of no confidence in the House of Commons after James Callaghan strikes a deal with the leader of the Liberal Party, David Steel.
- 23–25 March – Elizabeth II visits Papua New Guinea.
- 29 March – Income tax is slashed to 33p in the pound from 35p in the budget.
- 31 March – Elizabeth II visits Muscat.

=== April ===
- April – Mike Leigh's comedy of manners Abigail's Party opens at the Hampstead Theatre, starring Alison Steadman.
- 2 April – Red Rum wins the Grand National for the third time.
- 8 April – Punk band The Clash's debut album The Clash is released in the UK through CBS Records.
- 11 April – London Transport's Silver Jubilee AEC Routemaster buses are launched.
- 18–30 April – The Embassy World Snooker Championship moves to the Crucible Theatre, Sheffield, and attracts television coverage for the first time.
- 23 April
  - National Front marchers clash with anti-Nazi protesters in London.
  - Prostitute Patricia Atkinson is murdered in Bradford; she is believed to be the fourth woman to die at the hands of the mysterious Yorkshire Ripper.
- 29 April – British Aerospace is formed, to run the nationalised aviation industry.
- 30 April – Mid-Hants Railway reopens as a heritage line.

=== May ===
- 3 May – Light aircraft carrier HMS Invincible is launched at Barrow-in-Furness by Elizabeth II.
- 5 May
  - Conservatives make gains at local council elections, including winning the Greater London Council from Labour.
  - Silver Jubilee review of the police at Hendon by Elizabeth II.
- 7 May
  - The 3rd G7 summit is held in London.
  - Prime Minister of Canada Pierre Elliot Trudeau does a pirouette behind the back of Elizabeth II.
  - The 22nd Eurovision Song Contest is held in London. With Angela Rippon as the presenter, the contest is won by Marie Myriam representing France, with her song "L'oiseau et l'enfant" ("The Bird and the Child"); the British entry, Lynsey de Paul and Michael Moran's "Rock Bottom", takes second place.
- 10 May – Dounreay nuclear power plant experiences an explosion caused by potassium and sodium.
- 13 May – The Silver Jubilee Air Fair is held at Biggin Hill.
- 15 May – Liverpool F.C. are English league champions for the 10th time.
- 17 May – Elizabeth II commences her Silver Jubilee tour in Glasgow.
- 18 May
  - The UK is among 29 signatories of a Convention on the Prohibition of Military or Any Other Hostile Use of Environmental Modification Techniques.
  - Elizabeth II visits Cumbernauld and Stirling.
- 19 May – Elizabeth II visits Perth and Dundee.
- 21 May
  - Manchester United win the FA Cup for the fourth time by defeating Liverpool 2–1 at Wembley Stadium in the final. It is their first major trophy since they won the European Cup in 1968.
  - The Glasgow Subway closes for a complete modernisation programme, and the original trains dating back to 1896 are withdrawn from service.
- 23–27 May – Elizabeth II visits Edinburgh.
- 25 May – Liverpool F.C. win their first European Cup by defeating the West German league champions Borussia Mönchengladbach 3–1 in the final in Rome.
- 27 May
  - Elizabeth II opens the new air terminal building at Edinburgh Airport.
  - Prime Minister James Callaghan officially opens the M5 motorway, now complete with finishing of the final stretch around Exeter, 15 years after the first stretch (beginning near Birmingham) was opened.
- 28 May – Climax of Windsor Silver Jubilee celebrations: Elizabeth II visits the town officially on her Jubilee tour.
- 30 May – A gala performance for the Silver Jubilee is held at the Royal Opera House, London.

=== June ===
- 6–9 June – Silver Jubilee celebrations are held in the United Kingdom to celebrate 25 years of Queen Elizabeth II's reign, with a public holiday on 7 June.
- 12 June – The Supremes' farewell concert: US group The Supremes perform their final concert together at the Drury Lane Theatre, London, before disbanding permanently.
- 17 June – Wimbledon F.C., champions of the Isthmian League, are elected to the Football League in place of Workington in the Fourth Division.
- 20 June
  - Seventeen people are arrested during clashes between pickets and police at the Grunwick film processing laboratory.
  - Anglia Television broadcasts the fake documentary Alternative 3; it enters into the conspiracy theory canon.
- 26 June – Peter Sutcliffe victims: 16-year-old shop assistant Jayne McDonald, is found battered and stabbed to death in Chapeltown, Leeds; police believe she is the fifth person to be murdered by the same killer.

=== July ===
- 1 July – English tennis player Virginia Wade wins the women's singles title at Wimbledon.
- 4 July – Manchester United F.C. manager Tommy Docherty is sensationally dismissed by the club's directors due to his affair with the wife of the club's physiotherapist.
- 7 July
  - The first episode of the BBC documentary series Brass Tacks is aired, featuring a debate about whether Myra Hindley should be considered for parole from the life sentence she received for her role in the Moors Murders in 1966.
  - The 10th James Bond film – The Spy Who Loved Me – premieres in London. It is the third of seven films to star Roger Moore as James Bond, with Moore later calling the film his personal favourite of his tenure in the franchise.
- 10 July – Peter Sutcliffe victims: Bradford woman Maureen Long, 42, is injured in an attack believed to have been committed by the "Yorkshire Ripper" in the West Yorkshire city.
- 11 July
  - Gay News found guilty of blasphemous libel in a case (Whitehouse v. Lemon) brought on behalf of Mary Whitehouse's National Viewers and Listeners Association. It is the first such prosecution since 1921 and will be the last before the offence is abolished in 2008.
  - Don Revie announces his resignation after three years as manager of the England national football team.
- 12 July – Within 24 hours of resigning as manager of the England national football team, Don Revie accepts an offer to become the highest-paid football manager in the world when he is appointed manager of the United Arab Emirates national football team on a four-year contract worth £340,000.
- 14 July – Manchester United appoint Dave Sexton, manager of Queen's Park Rangers and previously Chelsea, as their new manager.
- 23 July – Chrysler Europe launch the Sunbeam, a three-door rear-wheel drive small hatchback similar in concept to the Ford Fiesta and Vauxhall Chevette.
- 29 July
  - Finance Act abolishes the collection of tithes.
  - Criminal Law Act 1977 in England and Wales creates the statutory crime of conspiracy among other changes.

=== August ===
- August – Government introduces voluntary Stage III one-year pay restraint.
- 10 August
  - The Queen visits Northern Ireland as part of her Jubilee celebrations under tight security.
  - Kenny Dalglish, 26-year-old Scotland striker, becomes Britain's most expensive footballer in a £440,000 transfer from Celtic to Liverpool.
- 11 August – Cricketer Geoff Boycott scores the 100th century of his career for England against Australia at Headingley, Leeds.
- 12 August–19 September – Union-Castle Line RMS Windsor Castle (1959) makes the line's last passenger mail voyage out of Southampton for Cape Town, the last major British ship to operate in the regular ocean liner trade.
- 13 August – Battle of Lewisham: an attempt by the far-right National Front to march from New Cross to Lewisham in southeast London leads to counter-demonstrations and violent clashes.
- 15 August – Rioting breaks out in Birmingham during demonstrations against the National Front.
- 17 August – Ron Greenwood, general manager of West Ham United, who guided the East London club to FA Cup and European Cup Winners' Cup glory as their team manager during the 1960s, accepts an offer from the Football Association to manage the England team on a temporary basis until December.
- 23 August – A new, smaller, £1 note is introduced.
- 26 August – First all-Luton-built Vauxhall Cavalier Mk1 family cars roll off the production line at Vauxhall Motors Luton factory.

=== September ===
- September – Ford launches the second generation of its flagship Granada saloon and estate models.
- 6 September – Car industry figures show that foreign cars are outselling British-built ones for the first time. Although Ford, British Leyland, Vauxhall and Chrysler are still the market leaders, foreign brands including Datsun, Fiat, Renault and Volkswagen are enjoying a growing market share.
- 16 September – Rock star Marc Bolan, pioneer of the glam rock movement at the start of the 1970s with T. Rex, is killed in a car crash in Barnes, London, at age 29. His girlfriend Gloria Jones, who was driving the car, is seriously injured.
- 19 September – Manchester United, the English FA Cup holders, are expelled from the European Cup Winners' Cup after their fans rioted in France during a first round first leg game with AS Saint-Etienne (which ended in a 1–1 draw) five days ago.
- 22 September – Sir Eric Miller, a backer of the Labour Party under Harold Wilson, commits suicide while under police investigation for financial dealings involving his property companies.
- 26 September
  - Freddie Laker launches his new budget Skytrain airline, with the first single fare from Gatwick to New York City costing £59 compared to the normal price of £186.
  - UEFA reinstates Manchester United to the European Cup Winners' Cup on appeal. However, they are ordered to play their return leg against AS Saint-Etienne at least 120 miles away from their Old Trafford stadium.
  - The Queen is escorted from Buckingham Palace after reports of an armed man on site.

=== October ===
- 1 October – Peter Sutcliffe victims: 20-year-old sex worker Jean Jordan is killed in Chorlton, Manchester. Her body is found nine days later. She will be the first of two victims in Manchester of a serial killer otherwise operating in West Yorkshire. Peter Sutcliffe is interviewed in connection with the crime but his alibi is believed at the time.
- 3 October – Undertakers go on strike in London, leaving more than 800 corpses unburied.
- 7 October – Rock band Queen's power ballad "We Are the Champions" is released.
- 14 October – Fourteen people are injured in a bomb explosion at a London pub.
- 15 October – World's End Murders: Christine Eadie and Helen Scott, both 17, disappear after leaving the World's End pub in Edinburgh, Scotland. Their bodies are found tied and strangled in the countryside the next day. In 2014, serial killer Angus Sinclair is convicted of the crime.
- 18 October – Elizabeth II, as Queen of Canada, opens the third session of the 30th Canadian Parliament.
- 25 October – Michael Edwardes succeeds Richard Dobson as chief executive and chairman of British Leyland.
- 26 October – Unfair Contract Terms Act 1977 regulates contracts by restricting the operation and legality of some contract terms, in particular limiting the applicability of disclaimers of liability.
- 27 October
  - Former Liberal leader Jeremy Thorpe denies allegations of the attempted murder of and having a relationship with model Norman Scott.
  - Punk band Sex Pistols release Never Mind the Bollocks, Here's the Sex Pistols on the Virgin Records label. Despite refusal by major retailers to stock it, it debuts at #1 on the UK Album Charts the week after its release. In a promotional stunt, the group perform on a boat on the River Thames shortly afterwards, only for the police to wait for them and make several arrests, including that of Malcolm McLaren, the band's manager.
- 28 October
  - Police in Yorkshire appeal for help in finding the killer later identified as Peter Sutcliffe, who is believed to be responsible for a series of murders and attacks on women across the county during the last two years.
  - Rock band Queen release the album News of the World.

=== November ===
- 14 November – Firefighters go on their first ever national strike, in hope of getting a 30% wage increase.
- 15 November
  - The Queen becomes a grandmother for the first time when Princess Anne gives birth to a son. On 22 December he is christened Peter Mark Andrew Phillips.
  - The first SavaCentre hypermarket, a venture between Sainsbury's and British Home Stores, opens at Washington, Tyne and Wear.
- 22 November – British Airways inaugurates regular London to New York City supersonic Concorde service.

=== December ===
- 3 December – The England football team fails to achieve World Cup qualification for the second tournament in succession.
- 10 December
  - James Meade wins the 1977 Nobel Prize in Economics jointly with the Swede Bertil Ohlin for their "Pathbreaking contribution to the theory of international trade and international capital movements".
  - Nevill Francis Mott wins the Nobel Prize in Physics jointly with Philip Warren Anderson and John Hasbrouck van Vleck "for their fundamental theoretical investigations of the electronic structure of magnetic and disordered systems".
- 12 December
  - Chrysler Europe announces its new Horizon range of five-door front-wheel drive hatchbacks, which will be built in the UK as a Chrysler, and in France as a Simca. It will give buyers a more modern alternative to the Avenger range of rear-wheel drive saloons and estates.
  - Ron Greenwood signs a permanent contract as England manager, despite England's failure to qualify for next summer's World Cup. The appointment is controversial, as there has been widespread support for Brian Clough of Nottingham Forest to be appointed.
- 14 December – Peter Sutcliffe victims: 25-year-old Leeds sex worker Marilyn Moore, is severely injured in an attack. Peter Sutcliffe, eventually identified as the Yorkshire serial killer responsible, is interviewed in connection with the crime but not arrested until 1981.
- 16 December – The Queen opens a £71,000,000 extension of London Underground's Piccadilly line, which runs to Heathrow Central, serving Heathrow Airport.
- 21 December – Four children die at a house fire in Wednesbury, West Midlands, as Green Goddess fire appliances crewed by hastily trained troops are sent to deal with the blaze while firefighters are still on strike. 119 people have now died as a result of fires since the strike began, but this is the first fire during the strike which has resulted in more than two deaths.
- 25 December
  - The Morecambe & Wise Christmas Show on BBC 1 television attracts an audience of more than 28,000,000 viewers, one of the highest ever in UK television history.
  - English-born comedian and silent film legend Sir Charlie Chaplin dies aged 88 of a stroke at his home in Corsier-sur-Vevey, Switzerland.
- 27 December – The much-acclaimed Star Wars film, which has been a massive hit in the United States, is screened in British cinemas for the first time.

=== Undated ===
- Inflation has fallen slightly this year to 15.8%, but it is the fourth successive year that has seen double-digit inflation.
- Colour television licences exceed black and white ones for the first time in the UK.

== Publications ==
- Bruce Chatwin's travel book In Patagonia.
- Patrick Leigh Fermor's travel book A Time Of Gifts.
- John Fowles' novel Daniel Martin.
- Edith Holden's nature notes The Country Diary of an Edwardian Lady (posthumous), which sells an initial print run of 148,000.
- Shirley Hughes' children's book Dogger.
- Paul Scott's novel Staying On.
- J. R. R. Tolkien's collection The Silmarillion (posthumous).
- Science fiction comic 2000 AD (launched February).

== Births ==
- 1 January – Rosena Allin-Khan, politician
- 7 January – Michelle Behennah, model
- 10 January – Michelle O'Neill, Sinn Féin leader
- 11 January – Billy Taylor, cricketer and umpire
- 13 January – Orlando Bloom, actor
- 24 January – Hayley Tamaddon, actress
- 5 February – Ben Ainslie, sailor
- 6 February – Jason Euell, footballer and coach
- 18 February – Chrissie Wellington, triathlete
- 2 March – Chris Martin, singer-songwriter (Coldplay)
- 7 March – Paul Cattermole, actor and singer (S Club 7) (died 2023)
- 10 March
  - Colin Murray, radio DJ
  - Rita Simons, actress
- 18 March – Danny Murphy, football player and pundit
- 19 March – Dan Walker, broadcaster
- 4 April – Stephen Mulhern, musician and television presenter
- 11 April – DJ Fresh, DJ and music producer
- 23 April – John Oliver, comedian and television personality
- 10 May
  - Anna Maxwell Martin, actress
  - Adrian Morley, rugby league footballer
- 13 May – Samantha Morton, actress
- 18 May – Danny Mills, footballer
- 30 May – Rachael Stirling, actress
- 31 May
  - Joel Ross, DJ
  - June Sarpong, television presenter
- 6 June – Bryn Williams, Welsh chef and author
- 24 June – Kristian Digby, television presenter (died 2010)
- 25 June – Layla El, wrestler, model, and dancer
- 2 July – Carl Froch, boxer
- 6 July – Simon Boas, humanitarian (died 2024)
- 10 July – Chiwetel Ejiofor, actor
- 24 July – Danny Dyer, actor and television presenter
- 30 July
  - Derek Mackay, politician
  - Ian Watkins, singer and convicyed sex offender (died 2025)
- 5 August – Ben Saunders, explorer
- 7 August – Charlotte Ronson, designer and Samantha Ronson, DJ (twin sisters)
- 10 August – Danny Griffin, footballer
- 17 August – Claire Richards, singer
- 4 September – Zita Lusack, gymnast
- 8 September – Gavin Meadows, freestyle swimmer
- 12 September – James McCartney, singer-songwriter
- 15 September – Tom Hardy, actor
- 1 October – Michael Tomlinson, politician
- 26 October – Sarah Storey, paralympian swimmer and cyclist
- 1 November – Alistair Griffin, singer/songwriter
- 4 November – Kavana, singer
- 15 November
  - Peter Phillips, son of Princess Anne
  - Jason Tindall, football player and manager
- 18 November – Miranda Raison, actress
- 22 November – Michael Preston, footballer
- 29 November – Eddie Howe, football player and manager
- 6 December
  - Andrew Flintoff, cricketer
  - Paul McVeigh, footballer
- 14 December – Jamie Peacock, rugby league player
- 23 December – Matt Baker, television presenter

== Deaths ==
- 5 January – Matt McGinn, Scottish folk musician, writer and entertainer (born 1928)
- 14 January
  - Anthony Eden, former Prime Minister (born 1897)
  - Peter Finch, actor (born 1916)
- 21 January – Alice Barringer Mackie, scientific collector (born 1885)
- 24 January – Sir Andrew Humphrey, Chief of the Air Staff (born 1921)
- 29 January – Johnny Franz, record producer (born 1922)
- 14 February – Sydney Jacob, Indian-born British tennis player (born 1879)
- 19 February – Anthony Crosland, politician (born 1918)
- 3 March
  - Brian Faulkner, prime minister of Northern Ireland (born 1921)
  - Percy Marmont, actor (born 1883)
- 26 March – Madeleine Dring, composer and actress (born 1923)
- 1 April – Cyril Radcliffe, 1st Viscount Radcliffe, lawyer and public servant involved in the Partition of India (born 1899)
- 17 April – William Conway, cardinal (born 1913)
- 2 June – Stephen Boyd, actor (born 1931)
- 3 June – Archibald Hill, physiologist, Nobel Prize laureate (born 1886)
- 19 June – Lady Olave Baden-Powell, Chief Girl Guide (born 1889)
- 4 August – Lord Adrian, physiologist, Nobel Prize laureate (born 1889)
- 13 August – Henry Williamson, novelist (born 1895)
- 16 August – William Wand, former Bishop of London (born 1885)
- 29 August – Edward Sinclair, actor (born 1914)
- 4 September – Lynton Lamb, illustrator and stamp designer (born 1907)
- 6 September – John Littlewood, mathematician (born 1885)
- 13 September – Leopold Stokowski, conductor (born 1882)
- 14 September – Jim Sullivan, Welsh rugby league player (born 1903)
- 16 September – Marc Bolan, glam rock musician (car accident) (born 1947)
- 25 September – William McMillan, sculptor (born 1887)
- 11 October – Misha Black, architect and designer (born 1910 in the Russian Empire)
- 4 November – Betty Balfour, actress (born 1902)
- 10 November – Dennis Wheatley, novelist (born 1897)
- 14 November – Richard Addinsell, composer (born 1904)
- 30 November – Terence Rattigan, playwright (born 1911)
- 12 December – Clementine Churchill, widow of Winston Churchill (born 1885)
- 15 December – Wilfred Kitching, 7th General of The Salvation Army (born 1893)
- 20 December – Henry Tandey, most highly decorated British private soldier of World War I (born 1891)
- 25 December – Sir Charlie Chaplin, silent film comedy actor and director, in Switzerland (born 1889)

== See also ==
- List of British films of 1977
