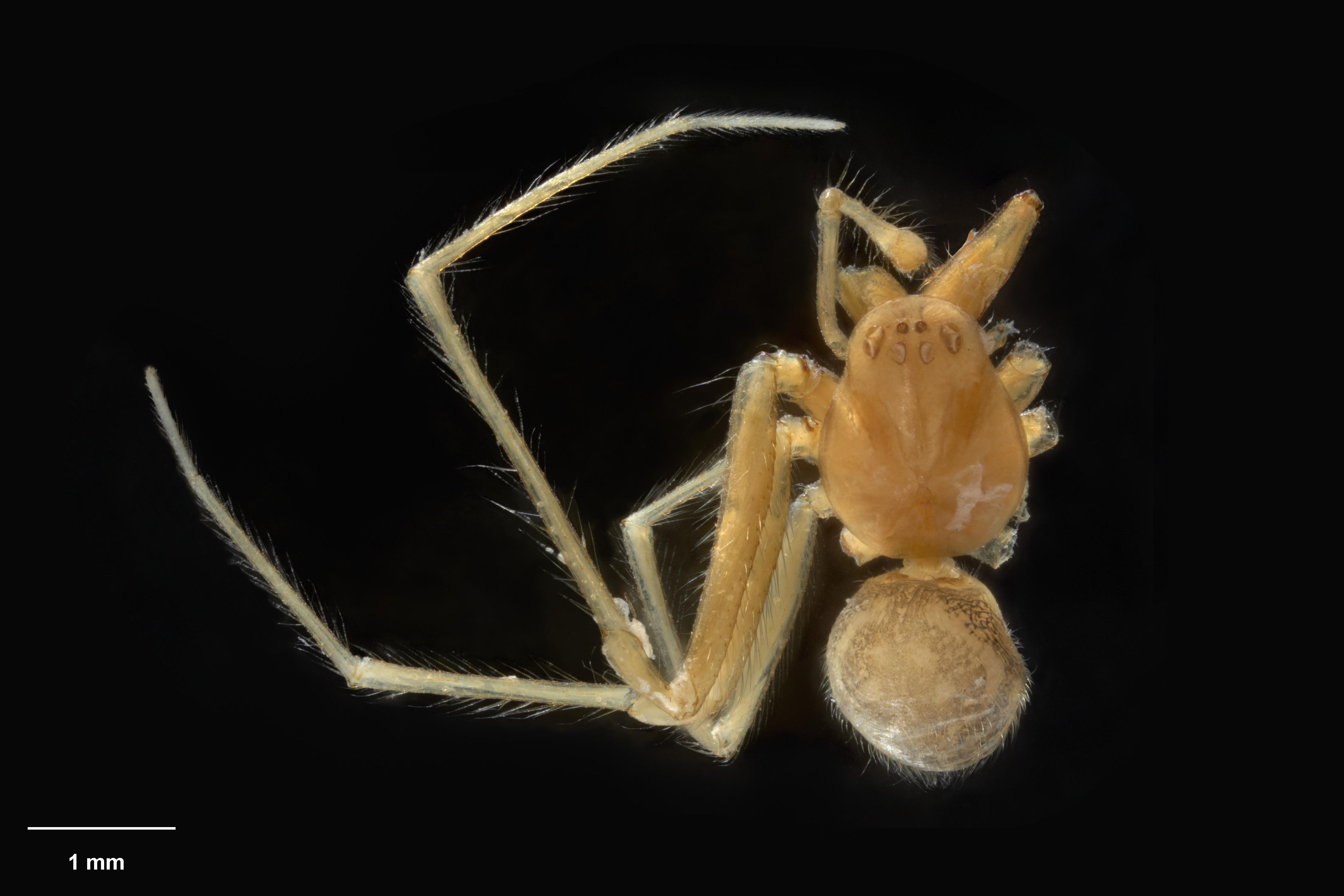

Conservation status
- Naturally Uncommon (NZ TCS)

Scientific classification
- Kingdom: Animalia
- Phylum: Arthropoda
- Subphylum: Chelicerata
- Class: Arachnida
- Order: Araneae
- Infraorder: Araneomorphae
- Family: Theridiidae
- Genus: Icona
- Species: I. drama

Binomial name
- Icona drama Forster, 1964

= Icona drama =

Species of spider

Icona drama is a species of comb-footed spider in the family Theridiidae. It is found in New Zealand.

== Taxonomy ==
This species was described by in 1964 by Ray Forster from male and female specimens. The holotype is stored in Te Papa Museum under registration number AS.000024.

== Description ==
The male is recorded at 3.63mm in length whereas the female is 3.48mm. The carapace is pale yellow with shading behind the eyes. The abdomen is greyish black with pale markings dorsally.

== Distribution ==
This species is only known from Auckland Island, New Zealand.

== Conservation status ==
Under the New Zealand Threat Classification System, this species is listed as "Naturally Uncommon" with the qualifiers of "Range Restricted" and "One Location".
