= Jim McKean (footballer) =

Australian rules footballer

Personal information
- Full name: James Hubert McKean
- Born: 2 August 1884; Melbourne, Victoria
- Died: 30 October 1936 (aged 52); Melbourne, Victoria
- Original team: Lethbridge
- Height: 170 cm (5 ft 7 in)
- Weight: 63 kg (139 lb)

Playing career^{1}
Years	Club	Games (Goals)
1903	Collingwood	1 (0)
- ^{1} Playing statistics correct to the end of 1903.

James Hubert McKean (2 August 1884 – 30 October 1936) was an Australian rules footballer who played with Collingwood in the Victorian Football League (VFL).
