= Drama (British TV series) =

UK television anthology series

Drama is a one-hour UK television anthology series produced by Open City Productions.It consists of seven episodes of abridged productions of classic plays that were aired on the British Broadcasting Corporation in 1977. Episode titles are Oedipus Tyrannus, Macbeth, Medieval Mystery Plays, The Venetian Twins, The Way of the World, The Wild Duck, and Six Characters in Search of an Author.

Actors included Patrick Stewart, Leo McKern, and Nigel Stock.
