= Brass Tacks (British TV programme) =

British current affairs programme (1977–1988)

Brass Tacks is a BBC television documentary programme on BBC from 1977 to 1988. Presenters included Brian Trueman, Eric Robson, David Dimbleby, John Ware and John Harrison.

The first episode aired on 6 July 1977, featured a debate as to whether or not the Moors murderer Myra Hindley should be considered for parole from the life sentence she had received more than a decade earlier.
