= Sarah Champion (presenter) =

British actress (born 1977)

- Born: 22 August 1977 (age 49); Harold Wood, London, England
- Partner: Pete Donaldson
- Children: 1
- Presenting career
- Style: Radio presenter, television presenter, actress
- Country: United Kingdom

Sarah Champion (born 22 August 1977) is an English television presenter, disc jockey and actress.

== Professional career ==
Champion has hosted The Official Album Chart Show, Planet Celebrity News and Radio Gaga for MTV networks, acted in Jonathan Creek for BBC One and ITV2 sitcom FM.

On 20 July 2005, Champion began working for British radio station Virgin Radio and remained on the station after it was rebranded as Absolute Radio in 2008. She currently presents an 11am to 2pm weekend show on Absolute Radio. She also presents a 10am to 1pm weekday show on its sister station Absolute 80s, where she also presents The Absolute 80s Singles Chart 4pm to 7pm on Sundays.

She covers the Night Shift show on an occasional basis.

In November and December 2020, Champion covered the 7pm-10pm weeknight show on Absolute Radio whilst the show's usual presenter Danielle Perry was on maternity leave.

Champion also presents a 12pm-4pm show every Saturday and Sunday on Magic Soul.

== Television ==
- Pub Ammo (2004) Herself
- Ready, Steady, Cook (2008) Herself
- Jonathan Creek: The Grinning Man (2009) Marcia
- FM (2009)
- White Gold Series 2 Episode 6 - Lizzie Farrell
- Casualty Series 37 Episode 16 "Fight or Flight" - May Brooker
