= 1958 in British music =

This is a summary of 1958 in music in the United Kingdom, including the official charts from that year.

== Events ==
- 24 January – Paul McCartney makes his first appearance at The Cavern Club in Liverpool with The Quarrymen.
- 5 February – Michael Tippett's Symphony No. 2 is first performed in London.
- 12 March – The UK has not entered the third annual Eurovision Song Contest, after coming 7th previous year. It is the second of the only two occasions in the contest's history that the UK fails to enter.
- 1 April – BBC Radiophonic Workshop created.
- 2 April – Ralph Vaughan Williams's Symphony No. 9 is premiered in London by the Royal Philharmonic Orchestra conducted by Malcolm Sargent.
- 10 April – Singer Cleo Laine and bandleader John Dankworth marry.
- 19 April – The Marquee Club first opens in London, as a jazz venue.
- July – Pete Seeger begins performing his new song "The Bells of Rhymney", based on a lyric by Welsh poet Idris Davies.
- c. 12 July – The Quarrymen (Paul McCartney, John Lennon (lead vocals), George Harrison, Colin Hanton (drums) and John Lowe (piano)) record a single 78 rpm shellac acetate disc at Phillips' Sound Recording Services in Liverpool: "In Spite of All the Danger" (McCartney–Harrison) and a cover of Buddy Holly's "That'll Be the Day".
- 28 August – Anton Bruckner's Symphony No 4 is performed at the Proms, the first complete Bruckner symphony to be played at the festival since 1903.
- 29 August – "Move It", the debut record by Cliff Richard and the Drifters, is released on the Columbia label, reaching number 2 on the UK Singles Chart. It is credited with being one of the first authentic rock and roll songs produced outside the United States.
- 2–9 December – Decca makes the first complete recording of Peter Grimes, conducted by the composer Benjamin Britten.

== Charts ==
- See UK No.1 Hits of 1958

== Classical music: new works ==
- William Alwyn – Fanfare for a Joyful Occasion, for orchestra
- Malcolm Arnold – Sinfonietta No. 2, for orchestra, Op. 65
- Lennox Berkeley
  - Concerto, for piano and double string orchestra, Op. 46
  - Poems of W.H. Auden (5), for soprano or tenor and piano, Op. 53
- Ronald Binge – "The Watermill"
- Arthur Bliss – The Lady of Shalott (ballet)
- Cornelius Cardew – Piano Sonata No. 3
- Daniel Jones – The Country Beyond the Stars (cantata)
- Peter Maxwell Davies – Prolation, for orchestra
- Peter Racine Fricker – A Vision of Judgement (chorus and orchestra)
- Thea Musgrave – String Quartet
- Edmund Rubbra – Violin Concerto
- Ian Parrott – Concerto for English horn (cor anglais) and orchestra
- Humphrey Searle – Symphony No 2
- Michael Tippett – Symphony No 2
- William Walton – Partita for orchestra
- Ralph Vaughan Williams – Symphony No. 9
- Grace Williams – Six Poems by Gerard Manley Hopkins for contralto and string sextet

== Opera ==
- Benjamin Britten – Noye's Fludde
- Humphrey Searle – The Diary of a Madman

== Film and incidental music ==
- Richard Addinsell – A Tale of Two Cities, starring Dirk Bogarde and Dorothy Tutin.
- John Addison – I Was Monty's Double.
- William Alwyn – A Night to Remember directed by Roy Ward Baker.
- Malcolm Arnold – Dunkirk, starring John Mills, Richard Attenborough and Bernard Lee.
- James Bernard – Dracula directed by Terence Fisher, starring Christopher Lee and Peter Cushing.
- Buxton Orr – Corridors of Blood, starring Boris Karloff and Christopher Lee.
- Leonard Salzedo – The Revenge of Frankenstein directed by Terence Fisher, starring Peter Cushing.

== Musical theatre ==
- Expresso Bongo, book by Wolf Mankowitz and Julian More, with music by David Heneker and Monty Norman
- Valmouth, by Sandy Wilson, based on the novel by Ronald Firbank

== Musical films ==
- The Duke Wore Jeans, starring Tommy Steele
- The Golden Disc, starring Lee Patterson and Terry Dene

== Births ==
- 8 January – Steve Garvey, bass guitarist (Buzzcocks)
- 17 January – Andrew Lowe Watson, composer of musical theatre and concert music (d.2021)
- 24 January – Jools Holland, pianist, bandleader and television presenter
- 21 February
  - Jake Burns, punk singer
  - Simon Holt, composer
- 23 February – David Sylvian, vocalist (Japan)
- 24 February – Mike Pickering, keyboardist (M People)
- 1 March – Nik Kershaw, singer-songwriter
- 5 March – Andy Gibb, English-born singer (died 1988)
- 8 March – Gary Numan, British singer
- 9 March – Martin Fry, vocalist of ABC
- 18 March – Neil Brand, British writer, pianist and composer
- 11 April – Stuart Adamson (Big Country) (d. 2001)
- 12 April – Will Sergeant, guitarist (Echo & the Bunnymen)
- 15 April – Benjamin Zephaniah, writer and musician
- 18 April – Les Pattinson, bassist (Echo & the Bunnymen)
- 25 April – Fish, Scottish singer
- 17 May – Alan Rankine, musician and producer
- 18 May – Toyah Willcox, actress and singer
- 25 May – Paul Weller, singer-songwriter
- 25 May – Howard Goodall, composer of musicals, choral music and music for television
- 11 June – Barry Adamson, singer and bass player
- 14 June – Nick Van Eede, Singer/Songwriter, vocalist (Cutting Crew)
- 29 June – Mark Radcliffe, singer and radio host
- 5 July – Paul Daniel, conductor
- 20 July – Mick MacNeil, Scottish keyboard player and songwriter (Simple Minds)
- 30 July – Kate Bush, singer and songwriter
- 4 August – Ian Broudie, singer-songwriter, guitarist, and producer (The Lightning Seeds)
- 7 August – Bruce Dickinson, musician
- 13 August – Feargal Sharkey, singer (The Undertones)
- 6 September – Buster Bloodvessel, vocalist (Bad Manners)
- 10 September – Siobhan Fahey, singer
- 21 September – Simon Mayo, radio presenter
- 14 October – Thomas Dolby, musician
- 20 October – Mark King, guitarist and singer
- 27 October – Simon Le Bon, singer (Duran Duran)
- 10 December – Helen DeMacque, singer (Pepsi & Shirlie)
- 19 December – Limahl, singer
- date unknown Patrick Hawes, composer, conductor, organist and pianist.

== Deaths ==
- 11 January – Alec Rowley, English organist and composer (born 1892)
- 2 April – Tudor Davies, operatic tenor (born 1892)
- 14 April – Katharine Goodson, pianist (born 1872)
- 3 May – Roland Cunningham, Australian-born British singer and actor (born 1872)
- 5 August – Joseph Holbrooke, composer (born 1878)
- 26 August – Ralph Vaughan Williams, British composer (born 1872)
- 2 September – Betty Humby Beecham, pianist (born 1908)
- 24 October – Martin Shaw, composer (born 1875)
- 27 October – John Wooldridge, film composer (born 1919) (car accident)
- 2 November – Adam Carse, composer (born 1878)
- 3 November – Harry Revel, musical theatre composer (b. 1905)
- 6 November – Francis George Scott, composer (born 1880)
- 28 December – Reginald Foresythe, jazz pianist, arranger, composer, and bandleader (born 1907)
- date unknown – John Strachan, ballad singer (born 1875)

== See also ==
- 1958 in British television
- 1958 in the United Kingdom
- List of British films of 1958
