= 1908 in British music =

This is a summary of 1908 in music in the United Kingdom.

== Events ==
- 11 January – The UK premiere of Paris: The Song of a Great City by Frederick Delius is given in Liverpool, conducted by Sir Thomas Beecham.
- 18 January – The first performance of Brigg Fair by Frederick Delius is given in Liverpool, conducted by Granville Bantock.
- 1 February – Claude Debussy appears for the first time in the UK, conducting the first UK performance of La Mer at Queen's Hall.
- 4 March – Charles Villiers Stanford's String Quartet No 5, op 104, is performed for the first time in Leeds.
- 26 March – The first public performance of York Bowen's Viola Concerto is given by Lionel Tertis at the Wigmore Hall.
- 30 May – The first performance in English (and in England) of Ethel Smyth‘s opera The Wreckers takes place in London, in concert form, at the Queen's Hall conducted by Arthur Nikisch.
- 16 July – The first concert devoted to the music of Arnold Bax takes place at the Aoelian Hall, London, including his early String Quintet and some songs.
- 31 July – Composer Frederick Septimus Kelly wins a gold medal for Great Britain as a member of the winning crew in the eights at the 1908 Summer Olympics in London.
- 9 September – At the Worcester Festival, the first performance of Hubert Parry's cantata Beyond These Voices There is Peace.
- 7 October – At Sheffield Festival, Thomas Beecham conducts the first UK performance of Sea Drift by Frederick Delius with the Queen’s Hall Orchestra and soloist Frederic Austin.
- 14 October – The first performance of Charles Villiers Stanford’s cantata, Ode on the Death of Wellington, conducted by the composer, takes place in Bristol as part of the 1908 Bristol Festival.
- 15 October – Cyril Rootham's cantata Andromeda receives its first performance at the Bristol Festival.
- 19 November – The first performance of the Symphony No 2 n G minor by Adam Carse takes place at the Royal College of Music in London.
- 3 December – Edward Elgar's Symphony No. 1 receives its première at the Free Trade Hall in Manchester, performed by the Hallé Orchestra and conducted by Hans Richter.
- 7 December – Four days after its première, Elgar's Symphony No. 1 is performed at the Queen's Hall by the London Symphony Orchestra, again conducted by Hans Richter.
- 11 December – Frederick Delius conducts the London Philharmonic Orchestra in the first performance of In a Summer Garden.
- date unknown – Alexander Mackenzie becomes President of the International Musical Society.

== Popular music ==
- "Has Anybody Here Seen Kelly?" ("Kelly from the Isle of Man") by Clarence Wainwright Murphy & Will Letters
- "I Hear You Calling Me" by Harold Lake & Charles Marshall
- "The Outlaw" by William Wallace

== Classical music: new works ==
- Arnold Bax – Lyrical Interlude for string quartet
- York Bowen – Viola Concerto in C minor
- Frank Bridge – Dance Rhapsody
- Henry Walford Davies – Solemn Melody for organ
- Frederick Delius
  - Dance Rhapsody No. 1
  - In a Summer Garden
- Harry Evans – Dafydd ap Gwilym (cantata)
- Hamilton Harty – Violin Concerto
- Joseph Hinton – L'allegro
- Joseph Holbrooke – Dramatic Choral Symphony
- Gustav Holst – Choral Hymns from the Rig-Veda (Group 1)
- Roger Quilter – Songs of Sorrow
- Ralph Vaughan Williams – String Quartet in G minor
- Alice Verne-Bredt – Phantasie Piano Trio and Phantasie Piano Quartet

== Opera ==
- A Welsh Sunset by Philip Michael Faraday
- Sāvitri by Gustav Holst

== Musical theatre ==
- 25 April – Havana, with book by George Grossmith, Jr. and Graham Hill, music by Leslie Stuart, lyrics by Adrian Ross and additional lyrics by George Arthurs, opens at the Gaiety Theatre, London, starring Evie Greene, W. H. Berry, Lawrence Grossmith and Mabel Philipson.
- 3 September – King of Cadonia, with book by Frederick Lonsdale, lyrics by Adrian Ross and Arthur Wimperis and music by Sidney Jones and Frederick Rosse, opens at the Prince of Wales Theatre in London, where it runs for 333 performances.

== Births ==
- 12 January – Joan Mary Last, music educator, author and composer (died 2002)
- 28 January – Jimmy Shand, accordionist and bandleader (died 2000)
- 29 February – A. L. Lloyd, folk song collector (died 1982)
- 18 March – Ivor Moreton, singer, composer and pianist (died 1984)
- 25 March – Bridget D'Oyly Carte, head of D'Oyly Carte Opera Company (died 1985)
- 10 July – Donald Peers, singer (died 1973)
- 18 July – Barry Gray, television composer (died 1984)
- 19 October
  - Spike Hughes, jazz musician, composer and music journalist (died 1987)
  - Sydney MacEwan, singer and priest (died 1991)
- 21 October – Howard Ferguson, composer and musicologist (died 1999)
- 17 December – William Brocklesby Wordsworth, English/Scottish composer and pianist (died 1988)
- date unknown – Jeannie Robertson, folk singer (died 1975)

== Deaths ==
- 2 March – Walter Slaughter, conductor and composer, 48
- 12 March – Clara Novello, soprano, 89

== See also ==
- 1908 in the United Kingdom
