= Dilys Glynne Jones =

Welsh advocate for the education of women

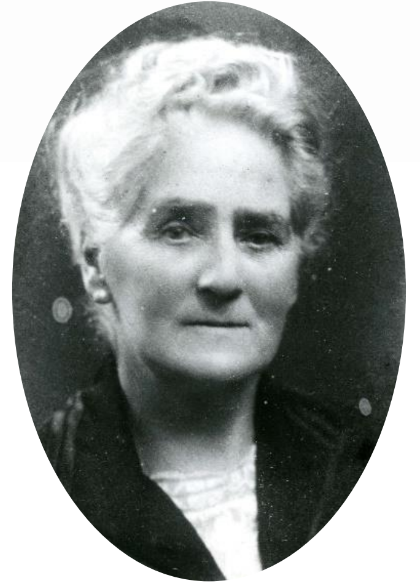
- Born: 1857; London
- Died: 1932 (aged 74–75)
- Alma mater: North London Collegiate School; Newnham College

Dilys Glynne Jones (1857–1932) was an advocate for the education of girls and women in Wales. The University College of North Wales lowered its flag to half mast on the day of her funeral.

== Life ==
Born in London, Davies was the daughter of the Welsh sculptor William Davies (Mynorydd) (1826–1901), who was himself the son of composer Moses Davies. Her elder sister Mary Davies was a noted mezzo-soprano. The family attended a Welsh-language chapel in London.

She attended Frances Buss's North London Collegiate School before she was at Newnham College, Cambridge for a year. She returned to work for Frances Buss as a teacher but in her spare time she was campaigning among the Welsh community in London.

The National Eisteddfod of Wales in 1882 was in Denbigh and she gave a talk titled A model school for girls. In 1886 the Eisteddfod was in Caernarfon and she again spoke about higher education for girls in Wales. She highlighted what she saw as a "fatal gap" in the education provision in Wales between elementary schools and university education. She disagreed with the views of the President of the British Medical Association and she noted that the Welsh Girls' School was in England.

In 1889 The Welsh Intermediate Education Act, 1889 came into effect and this reorganised education in Wales. Her sister's husband, William Cadwaladr Davies, edited a book titled The Welsh Intermediate Education Act: How to Use It and she wrote the chapter, The education of girls: some practical suggestions. It was published in the same year and she also got married at the newly opened Welsh Presbyterian Chapel on Charing Cross Road in London to a solicitor from Bangor.

She was a leading founder of the Association for Promoting the Education of Girls in Wales and she became a vice-president. She served as the association's honorary secretary until 1898 when Elizabeth Phillips Hughes took over that role. Her support for the University College of North Wales was so strong that after she died, in Bangor, on 12 March 1932 the college flew its flag at half mast on the day of her funeral.

== Private life ==
She married John Glynne Jones, a solicitor from Bangor, in 1889. They have five children including the plant pathologist Mary Dilys Glynne who was able to attend Bangor County School for Girls whose founding governors as a County School in 1895 included her mother.
