= Henry Erskine Allon =

English composer

Henry Erskine Allon (16 October 1864 – 3 April 1897) was an English composer.

== Biography ==
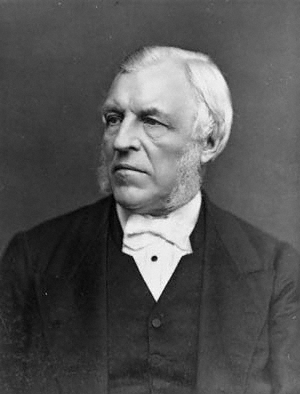
Henry Erskine Allon's father, Henry Allon, 1879.

Henry Erskine Allon was born on 16 October 1864 to the prominent Nonconformist minister Henry Allon (1818–1892) and his wife, Eliza née Goodman. Allon grew up among four sisters and two brothers, and was educated at Amersham Hall in Caversham, Reading. He first attended University College London, and then Trinity College, Cambridge, where he matriculated at in 1882. He obtained his Bachelor of Arts there in 1885. At Cambridge he received an English essay prize and graduated with a third in History. After graduation, he briefly studied for admission to the bar before deciding to become a musician. His father tried to get him appointed as an inspector of the university, but was dissuaded from this by his friend Matthew Arnold as he suspected the Tory government in power (whose Lord President had the job of appointing inspectors) would be unlikely to appoint Nonconformist inspectors.

Allon studied music under William Henry Birch and Frederic Corder and was a vigorous promoter of, and contributor to, the New Musical Quarterly Review, which he had assisted in the founding of. He was one of the composers featured in Granville Bantock's concert of new music by himself and his friends, put on at Queen's Hall on 15 December 1896. (Other composers included in this group were William Wallace, Reginald Steggall, Stanley Hawley and Arthur Hinton).

Allon was responsible for about thirty compositions, including six cantatas (among them, "Annie of Lochroyan" and "The Child of Elle"), and a number of solos and sonatas. Allon composed mainly for the piano and piano accompanied by violin. Musicologist Clyde Binfield has noted that while "there was nothing Celtic in his ancestry", his compositions often bore Scottish-inspired names, such as "The Maid of Colonsay" and "May Margaret". According to Edward Irving Carlyle, writing for the Dictionary of National Biography, his works "showed originality and power", and his brief biography in Alumni Cantabrigienses described him up as "a musician of great promise". Binfield was more forthright in his assessment of Allon, declaring "it was all promise, [as] he died in his early thirties".

Despite his father's strong Nonconformist zeal, Allon lapsed from that faith and instead became a member of the CUNU, a Congregationalist and interdenominational religious organisation.

Allon died on 3 April 1897, aged 32, from cerebral meningitis. He left £5,966 13s 8d in his will, approximately £466,428 in 2017 currency, and left his library of musical works to the Cambridge Union Society.
