= Henry Allon =

English Nonconformist divine

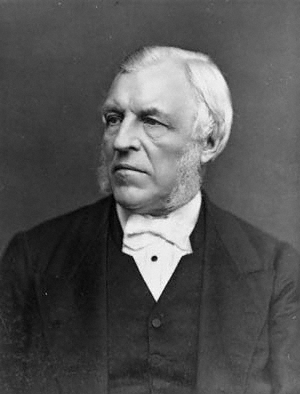
Henry Allon, 1879.

Henry Allon (1818–1892) was an English Nonconformist divine.

== Life ==
He was born on 13 October 1818 at Welton, Elloughton-cum-Brough, near Hull, in Yorkshire.

Under Methodist influence Henry Allon decided to enter the ministry, but, developing Congregational ideas, was trained at Cheshunt College, Hertfordshire and became closely associated with the Union Chapel in Islington. For a short while, he was co-pastor at the Union Chapel with the Rev. Thomas Lewis (1844–1852), but thereafter sole pastor for forty years (1852–92). During this time he gained considerable influence amongst metropolitan Congregationalists and secured the funds required for an ambitious rebuilding programme at the Union Chapel, between 1874 and 1890, from designs by James Cubitt.

In 1865, Allon became co-editor with Henry Robert Reynolds of the British Quarterly Review, and in 1877, the sole editor of that journal for another ten years. He published Memoir of the Rev. J. Sherman in 1863, Life of William Ellis in 1873, and sermons on The Vision of God in 1876.

Two hymns are attributed to him, Low in Thine Agony (1868), and Hark, hark, my soul! the Savior's voice is calling. He published numerous musical compilations, and his son, Henry Erskine Allon, was a composer (1864–97).

Allon was a vice-president of the American Missionary Association.

He died in Islington on 16 April 1892.

Allon is buried in the London Congregationalists' non-denominational garden cemetery, Abney Park Cemetery, in north London.

== Publications ==
Allon wrote several books on worship music, including Supplemental hymns for public worship (1869), Children's worship: a book of sacred song for home and school (1881), and The congregational psalmist (several volumes).

== Family ==
On 12 October 1848 he married Eliza Goodman; they had four daughters and three sons.

== Honours ==
He was awarded an honorary degree from Yale in 1871.
