= Karel Navrátil =

Czech violinist and composer (1867–1936)

Karel Navrátil (24 April 1867 – 23 December 1936) was a Czech violinist, composer and music educator. He was born in Prague, and studied in Vienna under Guido Adler and František Ondříček, afterward working as a composer and music teacher in Prague. Notable students include composers Helen Hopekirk, Arthur Hinton and John Powell. He died in Prague.

Some sources have confused him with Karl Nawratil (1836–1914), attributing to him a substantial output of chamber music actually composed by the latter.

== Selected works ==
Navrátil's compositions include opera, symphonies and symphonic poems, piano and violin concertos, chamber music and piano pieces, songs and choral works.

Opera

- Heřman, Op. 21
- Herman a Dorothea
- Salambo

Orchestral

- Symphony in G minor, Op. 4 [sic] (manuscript score dated 1902)
- Koncertní ouvertura (Concert Overture), Op. 5 (1872)
- Jan Hus, Symphonic Poem
- Žižka, Symphonic Poem
- Bílá hora (White Mountain; Blanche montagne), Symphonic Poem
- Indianerlegende for string orchestra with harp

Concertante

- Piano Concerto in F minor
- Violin Concerto in E major

Piano

- Variace na norské lidové písně (Variations on a Norwegian Folk Song; Variationen über ein norwegisches Volkslied), Op. 4 (1865)
- 2 Skladby (2 Pieces), Op. 6 (1873)
- 3 Balady (3 Ballades), Op. 14 (1883)
- 3 Skladby (3 Pieces), Op. 19 (1888)

Choral

- Mše D-dur (Mass in D major) for soloists, chorus, orchestra and organ, Op. 26
- Kantor Halfar for male chorus

Vocal

- 5 Lieder for voice and piano, Op. 10 (1881)
- 3 Balladen for low voice and piano, Op. 13 (1883); words by Ludwig Uhland
