= Mary Davies (mezzo-soprano) =

Background information
- Born: 27 February 1855
- Origin: London
- Died: 22 June 1930 (aged 75)
- Genres: Classical, folk songs
- Occupation: Mezzo-soprano
- Instrument: Singer

Mary Davies (27 February 1855 – 22 June 1930) was a Welsh mezzo-soprano and the first Secretary and second President of the Welsh Folk-Song Society. She was principal vocalist at the London Ballad Concerts, and at the National Eisteddfod of 1906.

== Life ==
Born in London, Davies was the daughter of the Welsh sculptor William Davies (Mynorydd) (1826–1901), who was himself the son of composer Moses Davies. Her younger sister Dilys Lloyd Davies was a leading advocate for the education of women in Wales. The family attended a Welsh-language chapel in London. Before attending the Royal Academy of Music she studied singing with Henry Brinley Richards, Megan Watts Hughes and Sarah Edith Wynne. She joined the London Welsh Choral Union, then under the direction of the composer John Thomas, which in 1873 awarded her a scholarship to the Royal Academy of Music where she was a pupil of Alberto Randegger.

She made her professional debut in her first year at the Royal Academy. In 1880 she sang in the first complete performance in England of Hector Berlioz's La damnation de Faust at the Hallé Concerts, Manchester.

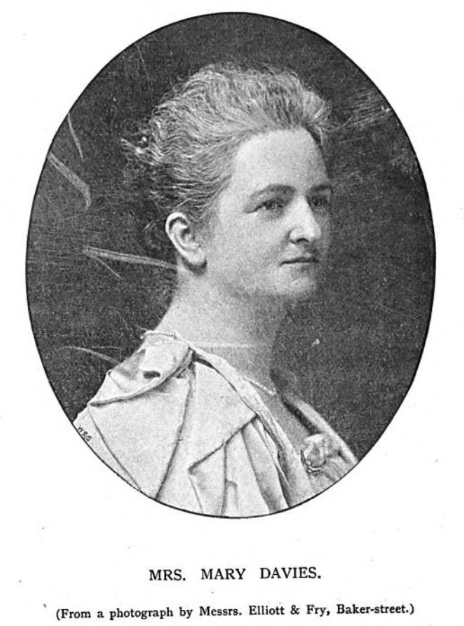
Mary Davies c.1895

Davies was active in the musical life of Wales, and in the collection of Welsh folk songs. She was a member of the governing body of the University of Wales, from which she received an honorary doctorate.

In 1888 she married William Cadwaladr Davies, a journalist and the first registrar of the University College of North Wales, Bangor. After her husband's death in 1905 she lived in London. She died on 22 June 1930 and was buried in Bangor.

== Awards ==
- Honorary Mus.Doc., University of Wales (1916)
- Honourable Society of Cymmrodorion medal for services to music (1929)
