= Welsh Presbyterian Chapel, Charing Cross Road =

Church building in Westminster, London, England

Coordinates: 51°30′46″N 0°07′45″W

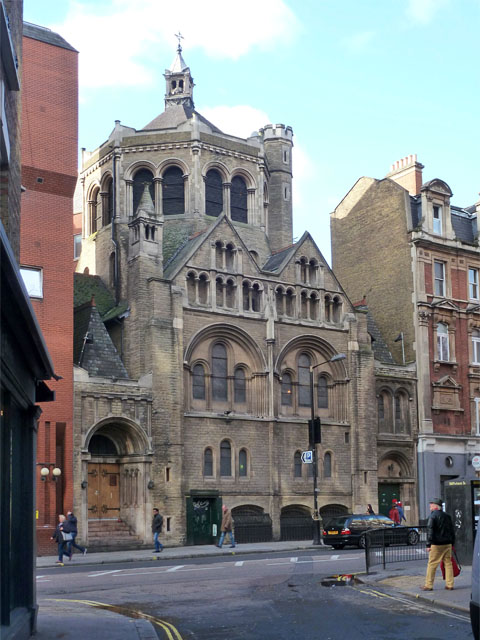
The chapel in November 2015

The Welsh Presbyterian Chapel is a former Presbyterian Church of Wales church on Charing Cross Road in the City of Westminster, Greater London, England. It was opened in 1888; the last service was held in July 1982. It was the site of the Limelight nightclub in the 1980s.

== Design ==
The chapel was designed by James Cubitt in the Romanesque Revival style and built in 1888. It is made from white brick 'Yorkshire parpoints' with Ancaster stone dressings topped by a slate roof. Internally it is dominated by a large central square space with short transepts to the east and west. An organ was situated above the gallery behind the pulpit. The chapel has a prominent octagonal dome. In 1984 it was converted internally for use as an office. The chapel was built as a Presbyterian church for the Welsh community in London. The interconnected Minister's house is located at 136 Shaftesbury Avenue and was the official entrance to the chapel. The building facing Shaftesbury Avenue housed the chapel's library. It is a four-storey house in red brick designed to be reminiscent of the medieval domestic architecture of Bruges.

The chapel was listed Grade II on the National Heritage List for England in February 1982.

== History ==
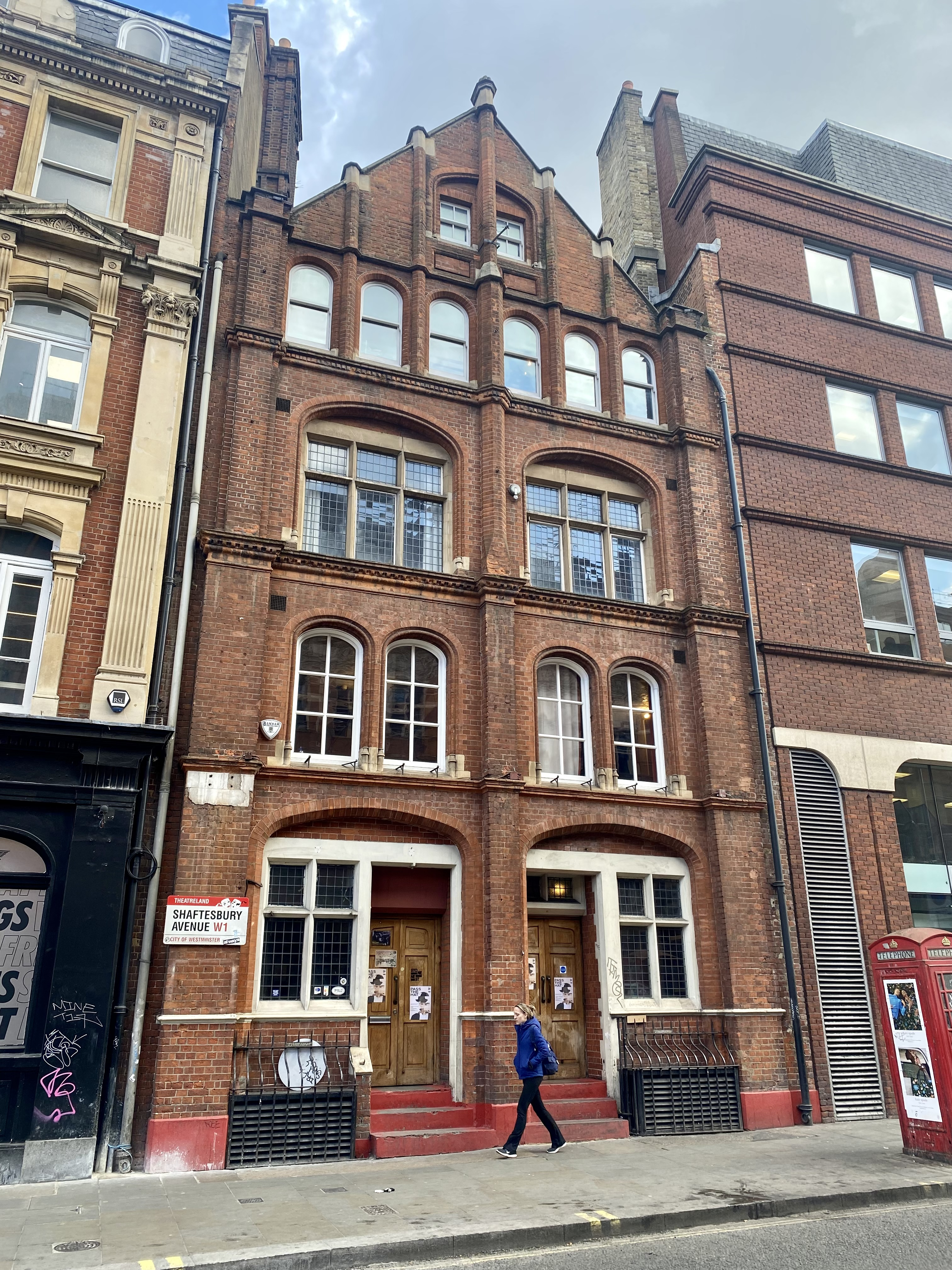
The rear entrance to the chapel on Shaftesbury Avenue

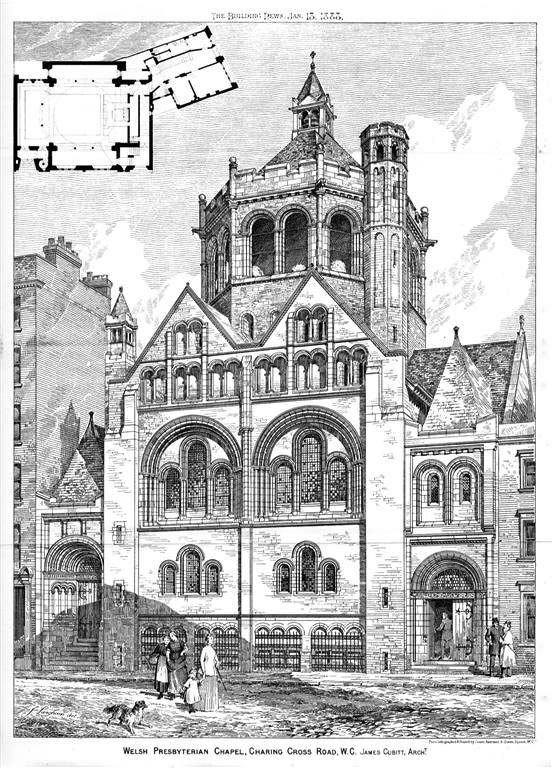
Elevation and plan of the chapel

The Welsh Calvinistic Methodist Connexion leased the site from the Metropolitan Board of Works in November 1886. The creation of Shaftesbury Avenue in 1884 by the Metropolitan Board of Works had necessitated the move from the group's previous chapel in Nassau Street (now Gerrard Place). The freehold of the site was acquired by the group from London County Council in 1889. The first marriage to take place at the chapel was between the educationalist Dilys Glynne Jones (born Davies) and John Glynne Jones from Bangor.

Prior to the Second World War the chapel had the largest weekly attendance of any of the Welsh chapels of London. In 1903 a Sunday service at the chapel was attended by 623 people. The chapel was perceived as the most 'fashionable' of London's Welsh chapels due to its location in the West End. The services were attended by prominent Welsh businesspeople, politicians, and lawyers based in London. The presiding minister, Peter Hughes Griffths, was a celebrity in his native Wales and served as the minister at the chapel from 1902 until his death in 1937. The chapel was the first of the Welsh chapels in London to close. The last service was held at the chapel on 9 July 1982. It was sold in March 1985 for £1 million.

In the 1980s the chapel was the site of the Limelight nightclub, which saw performers such as Boy George and Duran Duran at the venue. It subsequently became a branch of the Walkabout Australian themed pub chain. It was bought by a Ukrainian philanthropist in 2011; it is owned by the charity Stone Nest. Stone Nest were granted approval by Westminster City Council in 2018 to transform the site into a space for the performing arts as well as hosting a restaurant and bar.

In November 2023 the former chapel and minister's house were put up for sale through Knight Frank, with a guide price of £14,750,000.
