= Ottilie Maclaren Wallace =

British sculptor (1875–1947)

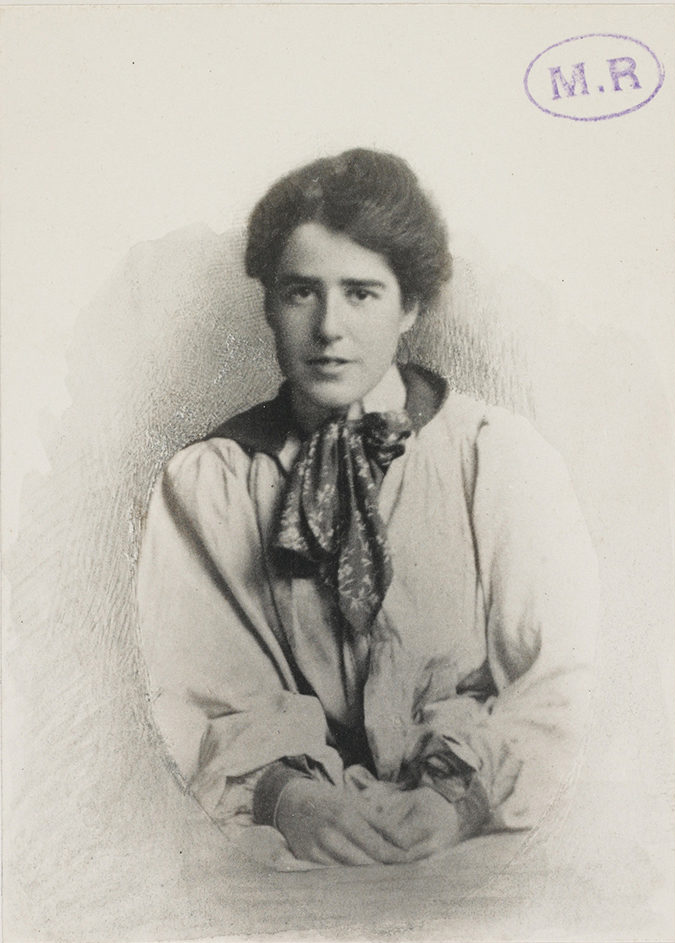
- Born: Ottilie Helen McLaren; 2 August 1875; Scotland
- Died: 17 October 1947 (aged 72)
- Resting place: Malmesbury Cemetery, Wiltshire
- Education: Académie Colarossi
- Known for: Sculpture
- Spouse: William Wallace (m. 1905; died 1940)
- Parents: John McLaren (father); Ottilie Schwabe (mother)
- Relatives: Priscilla Bright McLaren (aunt)

Ottilie Helen McLaren (or MacLaren) Wallace (2 August 1875 – 17 October 1947) was a sculptor, a pupil of Auguste Rodin and an Associate Member of the Royal Society of British Sculptors.

== Early life ==
Ottilie Helen McLaren was the youngest daughter of Lord John McLaren (1831–1910), an Edinburgh lawyer and the one-time Lord Advocate of Scotland, and his wife from Glasgow, Ottilie Schwabe, who was from a German-Jewish family. The family was respectable and well to do, with a town house in Moray Place, Edinburgh, and a holiday home in the Highlands. Wallace considered herself a "mixture of Celt and Jew". It is possible Wallace initially took up sculpture as therapy, after an illness.

== Studies ==
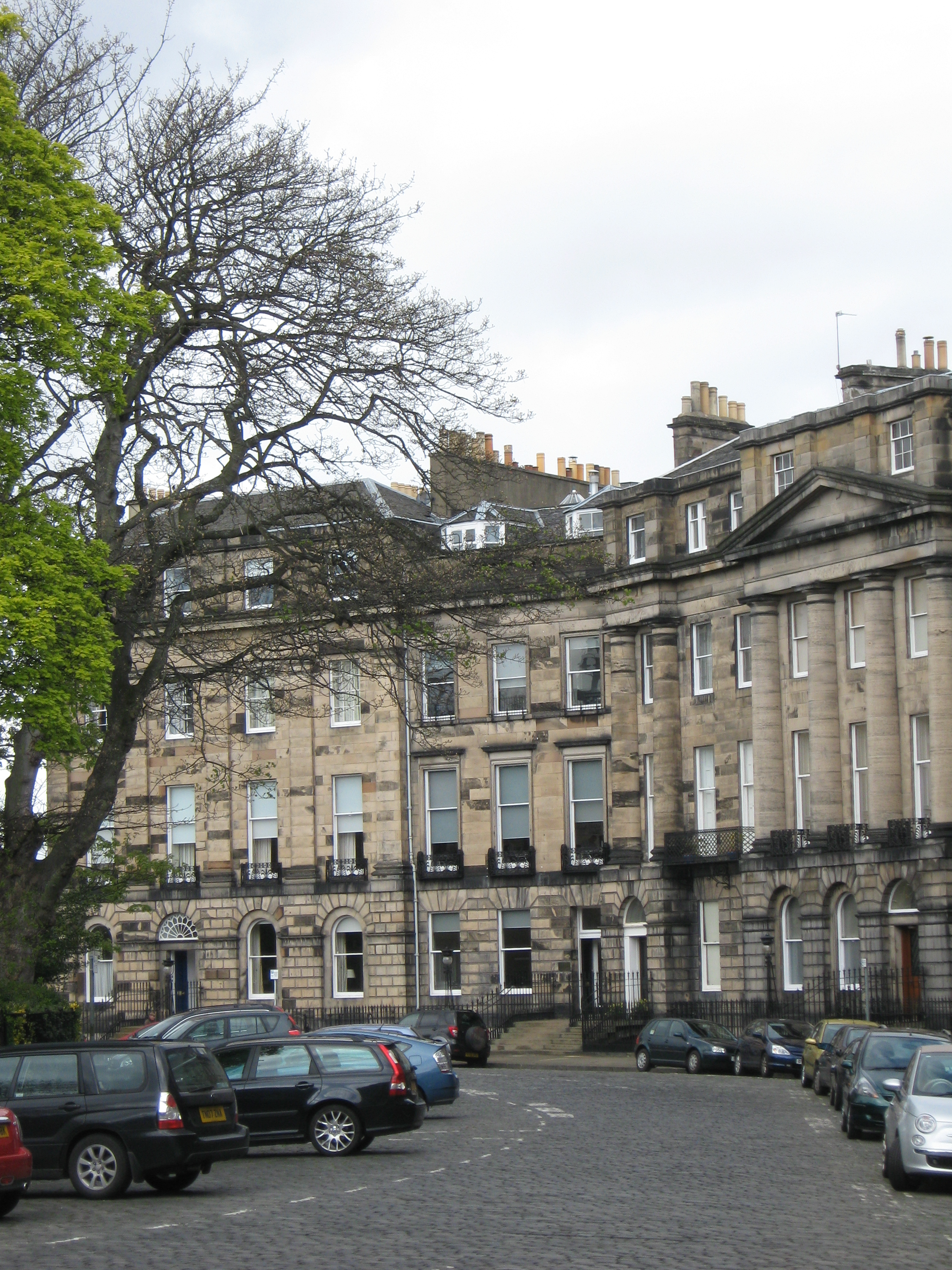
Moray Place, Edinburgh, where Wallace's family had a town house.

In 1880s Edinburgh, women's art education was strictly constrained by the regulations of the Royal Scottish Academy. Although women could study up to a certain level at the Board of Trustees school, they were not admitted to RSA classes and were forced to continue their education independently.

From 1895 to 1896, Wallace studied under poet and sculptor James Pittendrigh MacGillivray. Supportive of her ambitions as a sculptor, in 1897 Wallace's family provided an allowance enabling her to further her studies in the progressive art schools of Paris.

At the turn of the century, Paris was an acknowledged cultural capital with a thriving avant-garde arts scene. Wallace joined the Académie Colarossi, where she was taught by the award-winning sculptor Jean-Antoine Injalbert. She also attended anatomy classes at the École des Beaux-Arts, which was admitting women students for the first time.

In 1899, after a short time under the tutelage of Camille Claudel, Wallace became a pupil of Auguste Rodin, whose innovative and expressive work, controversial in his time, is now considered a fore-runner of modern sculpture. Wallace worked with Rodin closely for the next two years. She also helped organise his pavilion at the 1900 International World Fair in Paris, which attracted commissions from international patrons.

From 1900 to 1901, Wallace took a room in the artists' quarter of Montparnasse in rue Duguay-Trouin where, in defiance of convention, she could be freely visited by her fiancé, William Wallace.

== Work ==
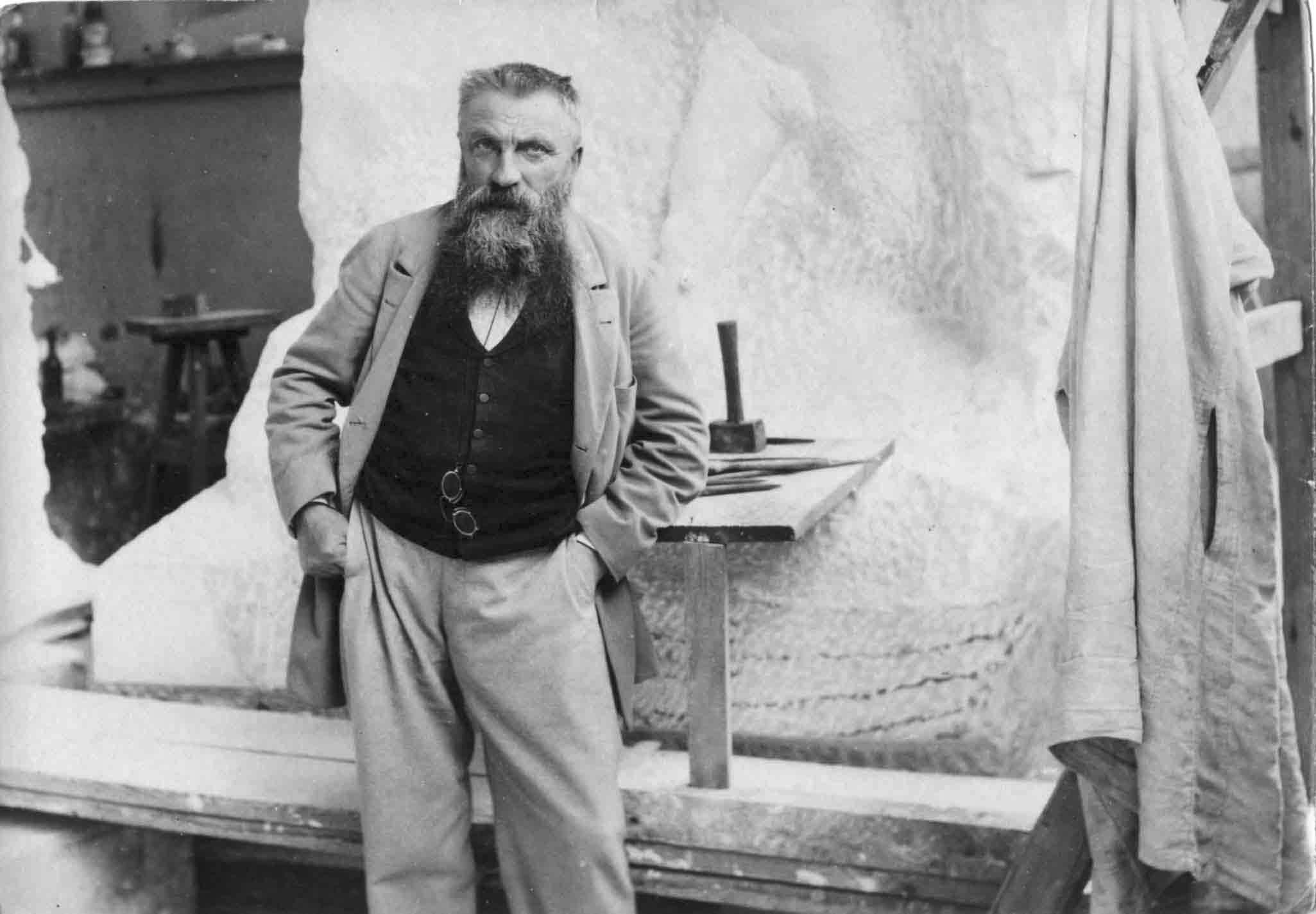
Auguste Rodin in his Paris studio, 1898, where Wallace studied.

On her return to Edinburgh in 1901, the artist rented a studio in George Street, where she continued to work. She exhibited at the Royal Scottish Academy.

On 11 April 1905, she married William Wallace, an ophthalmic surgeon, painter and composer. Soon after, Wallace moved to London where she set up a sculpture class for women, based on Rodin's methods.

Despite her association with Rodin, Wallace's own work was in a more classical European style. Much of her work is in private collections, and is currently little seen.

Her statue of her aunt Priscilla Bright McLaren is in the property of the National Trust at Bodnant.

== Exhibitions and awards ==
Wallace exhibited regularly with the International Society of Sculptors, Painters and Engravers (London), the Royal Academy of Arts (London), the Royal Scottish Academy (Edinburgh), and also at The Royal Glasgow Institute of the Fine Arts (Glasgow). From 1905, she usually exhibited under her married name. Wallace was an Associate Member of the Royal British Society of Sculptors.

William Wallace's A Suite in the Olden Style for piano is dedicated to her.

In 2025, her sculpture of F. S. Oliver is featured in the exhibition "In the Time of Camille Claudel, Being a Woman Sculptor in Paris" organised by the Musée Camille Claudel.
