= 1907 in British music =

This is a summary of 1907 in music in the United Kingdom.

== Events ==
- 20 February – The first performance of Charles Villiers Stanford’s String Quartet No 4 in G minor, Op. 99 takes place at a chamber concert of the Cambridge University Musical Society.
- 21 February – Frederick Delius's new opera, A Village Romeo and Juliet is premièred at the Komische Oper Berlin, under the title Romeo und Julia auf dem Dorfe.
- 22 February – The British premiere of A Village Romeo and Juliet takes place at the Royal Opera House, Covent Garden, conducted by Thomas Beecham.
- 19 March – Edward Elgar makes his first professional appearance in New York, conducting The Apostles in Carnegie Hall.
- 17 April – Tom Jones (Fielding), a comic opera by Edward German, is produced at the Apollo Theatre in London.
- 8 June – Franz Lehár‘s The Merry Widow opens at Daly's Theatre in London, running for 778 performances.
- 22 August – La Princesse Maleine (Maeterlinck) a symphonic poem by Cyril Scott, is performed for the first time in London.
- 24 August – Pomp and Circumstance March No 4 by Edward Elgar, is performed for the first time in London.
- 12 September – The first performance in Britain of Mozart’s Concerto for Three Pianos, K242, is given at the Proms, with Henry Wood, York Bowen and Frederick Kiddle as soloists, conducted by Henri Verbrugghen.
- 27 September – Ralph Vaughan Williams conducts the world premieres of his second and third Norfolk Rhapsodies at the Cardiff Festival. Both pieces are subsequently withdrawn by the composer.
- 5 October – Irish tenor John McCormack makes his English operatic debut in Mascagni’s Cavalleria Rusticana at Covent Garden, London
- 8 October – For Valor, a concert overture by Havergal Brian, is performed for the first time in London, conducted by Henry Wood.
- 10 October – The premiere of Charles Villiers Stanford‘s Stabat Mater: A Symphonic Cantata, Op. 96, takes place in Leeds Town Hall as part of the Leeds Festival.
- 16 October – The first performance of Frederic Austin‘s symphonic rhapsody Spring is given at the Queen’s Hall as part of the Proms.
- 27 October – The Piano Concerto in C minor by Frederick Delius, revised as a one-movement work, is given its first performance at the Queen’s Hall.
- 15 November – Pianist Myra Hess makes her debut in London at 17 years old, playing Beethoven’s Fourth Piano Concerto, with Thomas Beecham conducting.
- 14 December – The symphonic suite The Wand of Youth by Edward Elgar is performed for the first time in London.
- date unknown
  - John Ansell is appointed musical director at the Playhouse Theatre.
  - George Dyson returns to Britain after a period in continental Europe and is appointed director of music at the Royal Naval College, Osborne.

== Popular music ==
- "Follow the Colours" by Edward Elgar & Captain William de Courcy Stretton
- "I Do Like To be Beside the Seaside" by John A. Glover-Kind

== Classical music: new works ==
- York Bowen – Piano Concerto No. 3 "Fantasia" Op. 23
- Havergal Brian – English Suite
- Dora Bright – The Dryad (ballet)
- Frederick Delius – Songs of Sunset; Brigg Fair
- George Dyson – Siena (lost)
- Gustav Holst – A Somerset Rhapsody
- Charles Villiers Stanford – Stabat Mater
- Ralph Vaughan Williams – In the Fen Country (revised)

== Opera ==
- Frederick Delius – A Village Romeo and Juliet (see Events)
- Edward German – Tom Jones

== Musical theatre ==
- 31 January – Miss Hook of Holland, with music and lyrics by Paul Rubens, and book by Austen Hurgon and Rubens, opens at the Prince of Wales Theatre; it runs for 462 performances.
- 11 September – The Gay Gordons, with a book by Seymour Hicks, music by Guy Jones and lyrics by Arthur Wimperis, C. H. Bovill, Henry Hamilton and P. G. Wodehouse, opens at the Aldwych Theatre.

== Publications ==
- J. R. Sterndale – The Life of William Sterndale Bennett. Cambridge University Press.

Ernest Walker – A History of Music in England. Forgotten Books. ISBN 1334045305.

== Births ==
- 21 February – Guirne Creith, composer (died 1996)
- 26 February – Harry Gold, jazz saxophonist and bandleader (died 2005)
- 3 March – Joy Finzi, wife of Gerald Finzi and founder of the Finzi Trust (died 1991)
- 12 April – Imogen Holst, conductor and composer and only child of Gustav Holst (died 1984)
- 18 May – Clifford Curzon, pianist (died 1982)
- 28 May – Reginald Foresythe, jazz pianist, arranger, composer, and bandleader (died 1958)
- 15 August – Bob Pearson, singer and pianist with his brother Alf as half of Bob and Alf Pearson (died 1985)
- 12 December – Roy Douglas, composer, pianist and arranger (died 2015)
- date unknown – Charles Turner, composer and Second World War spy (died 1977)

== Deaths ==
- 28 February – Rosina Brandram, operatic contralto and actress (D'Oyly Carte), 61 (heart failure)
- 29 October - Megan Watts Hughes, singer, songwriter and discoverer of "Voice-Figures", 65

== See also ==
- 1907 in the United Kingdom
