= Union Chapel, Islington =

Church in London, England

Union Chapel
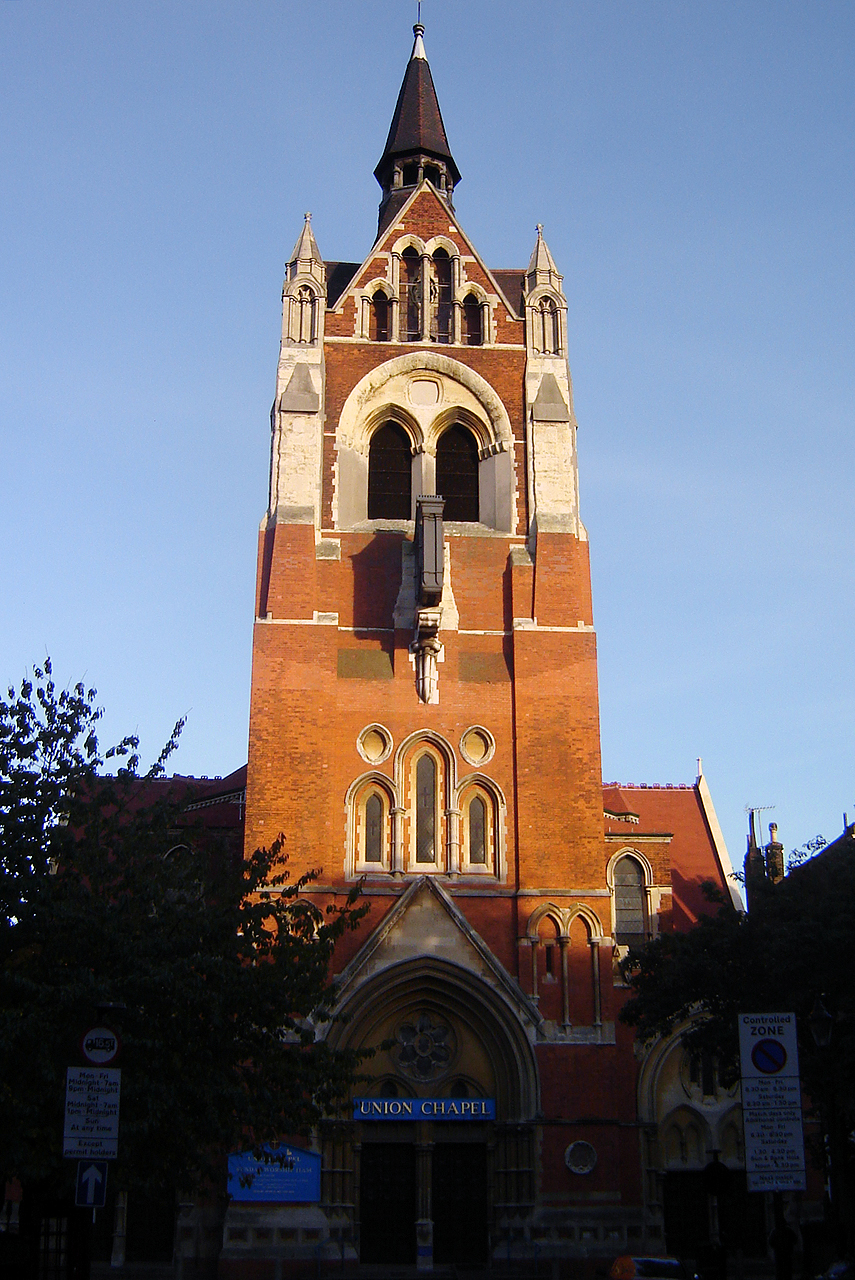
- The chapel in October 2006
- Union Chapel
- 51°32′41″N 0°06′09″W
- Location: London Borough of Islington
- Country: England
- Denomination: Congregationalist
- Website: www.unionchapel.org.uk

Architecture
- Architect: James Cubitt
- Years built: 1874–1877, additions through 1890

Union Chapel is a working Congregational church, live-entertainment venue and charity drop-in centre for the homeless in Islington, London, England. Built in the late 19th century in the Gothic Revival style, the church is a Grade I-listed building. It is at the north end of Upper Street, near Highbury Fields.

== As a venue ==
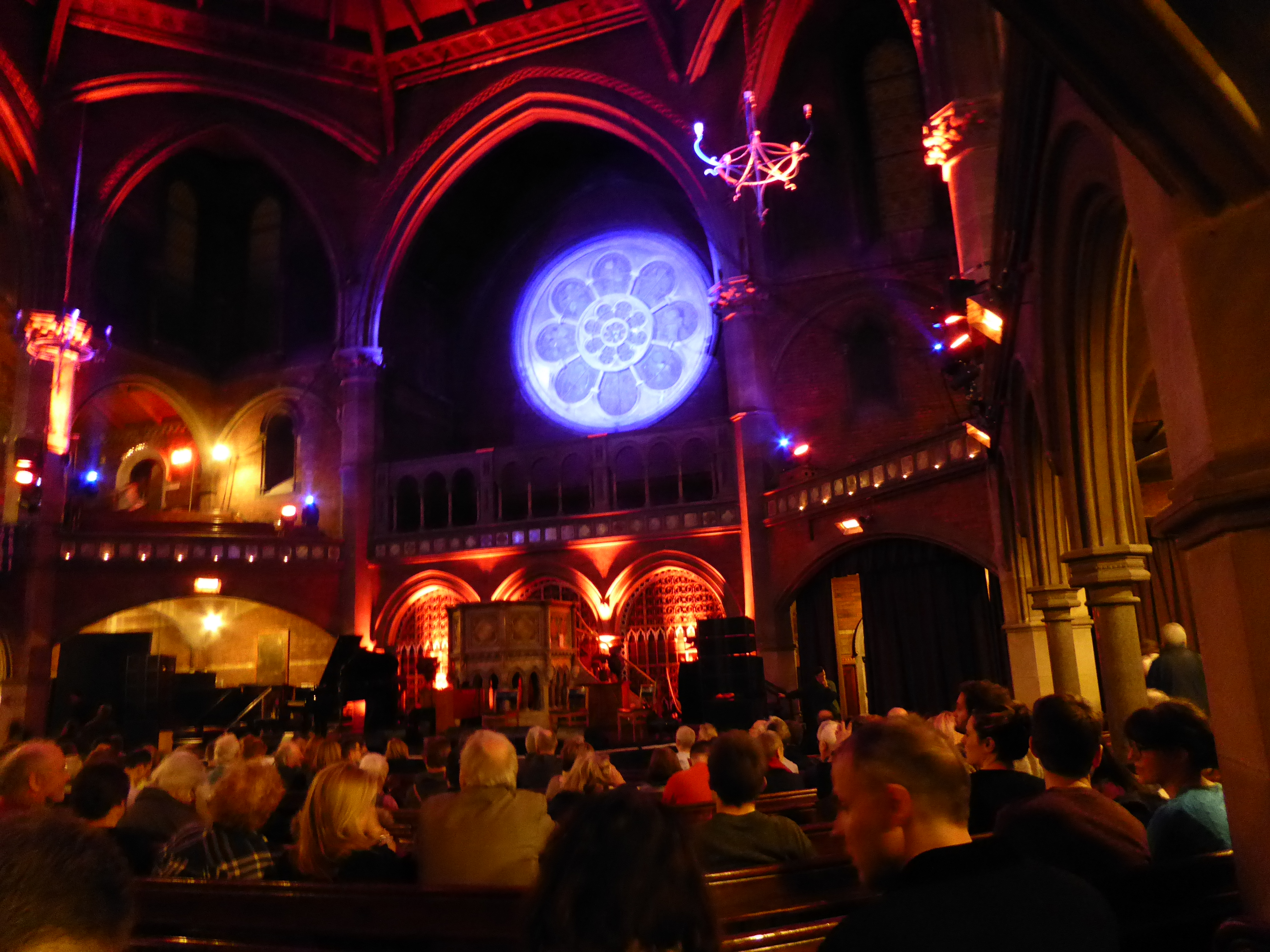
The church interior prepared for a music performance (February 2016)

Union Chapel hosts live music, film, spoken word and comedy events. There are around 250 events per year. It was voted London's Best Live Music Venue by readers of Time Out magazine in 2002, 2012, 2014 and 2026. It has a reputation for excellent acoustics, due to its design.

== Margins Homelessness Project ==
The Margins Project, based in the Union Chapel, provides a range of support services to people facing homelessness, crisis and isolation. It operates a twice-weekly drop-in that provides advice around accessing benefits, support showers and laundry facilities. There is a Supported Employment Programme which provides opportunities for people who have experienced homelessness and crisis to get back into employment. There is also a Winter Night Shelter and support services such as access to therapy.

== Union Chapel Church ==
Union Chapel is a Congregational church and part of the Congregational Federation. The church describes itself as "a community of Christians of diverse backgrounds committed to living lives that are spiritual, sustainable and responsive to the Gospel’s prophetic call for justice and peace." The church meets every Sunday at 11am and is committed to racial, economic, social and climate justice.

== History ==
The congregation first met in 1799 in a house in Highbury Grove as a union of evangelical Anglicans and non-conformists. Between 1805 and 1809 a new chapel was built by Henry Leroux on the present site in Compton Terrace, just off Upper Street, and the congregation moved to it in 1806. The new chapel was a two-storeyed building in the classical style with a central pediment, and with two houses on either side. A girls' school was founded in 1807 and a boys' founded in 1814. The Rev. Thomas Lewis, the father of the historian Samuel Lewis, was minister of the chapel from 1804–52, and lived next door at number 19.

His successor, the Rev. Henry Allon, was minister from 1852 to 1892 and greatly increased the congregation as the local population grew. The building became "inconveniently crowded", and by the 1870s the Chapel had been enlarged and given a colonnaded façade.

It was replaced by the current building in the Victorian gothic style of architecture, designed by James Cubitt of Loughton and built between 1874 and 1877, with further additions from 1877 to 1890. Its Gothic style is uncommon among non-conformist churches, and its plan is based on the church of Santa Fosca in Torcello. It provided seating for 1,700 worshippers, and a Sunday School Hall for 1,000 children. Behind the church, the large Sunday School was built on the Akron Plan. Two Liberal prime ministers, William Ewart Gladstone and H. H. Asquith, were at different times members of the congregation. The solid tower was completed in 1889.

The chapel building was first listed in 1972 and is Grade I listed. The former Sunday school, lecture hall and vestry block was separately Grade II* listed in 2011.

The chapel was used for a major scene in the 1982 film, Who Dares Wins. In 1981 the charity Friends of Union was founded in response to attempts to demolish the church. Since then the Friends have worked to preserve the buildings. The charity Union Chapel Project established in 1991 organises activities including gigs and events to help raise money for the building and open it up.

== Ministers ==
- Thomas Lewis 1804–1852
- Henry Allon 1844–1892
- Hardy Harwood 1891–1914
- Charles James Barry MA (Cantab) ?
- Ronald Taylor 1940–1980
- Gareth Trevor Jones 1981–1986
- Janet Wootton 1986–2004
- ? 2004–2010
- Karen Stallard 2010–2018
- Vaughan Jones 2017–2024
- Cathy Bird 2025–present

== Organ ==
The organ at Union Chapel was designed and built for the size and acoustics of the new Chapel building in 1877 by master organ builder Henry "Father" Willis. Neither James Cubitt, the architect of the Chapel, nor Rev Henry Allon, the minister at the time, wanted the congregation to be distracted by the sight of an organ or organist: they wanted the music itself to be the focus during worship. The organ is therefore hidden behind ornate screens under the rose window, which itself hints at the organ's importance, with its depiction of eight angels all playing different musical instruments.

The organ has a fully-functional and original hydraulic (water powered) blowing system, which can be used as an alternative to the electric blowers. It is one of the last remaining organs of this type in the United Kingdom, and the only remaining one in England.

The organ was restored in 1946 by Monk & Gunther; and by Harrison & Harrison in 2013.

=== Organists ===
- John Henry Gauntlett 1852–1861
- Ebenezer Prout 1861–1873
- Fountain Meen 1880–1909
- John Hooker 1973–2002
- Claire M. Singer 2012–present

=== Organ Reframed ===
Organ Reframed, launched in 2016, is an annual music festival at Union Chapel with an experimental approach to the use of the organ. It is curated by composer and Music Director of the organ at Union Chapel, Claire M Singer. Partners include London Contemporary Orchestra and Spitfire Audio. Commissions have included work from Éliane Radigue, Low, Hildur Guðnadóttir, Adam Wiltzie, Phil Niblock, Darkstar, Philip Jeck, Sarah Davachi, and Mark Fell.

== See also ==
- The Union Chapel Concert – a 1997 live album by Guy Evans and Peter Hammill recorded at the chapel
