= Arthur Hinton =

English composer (1869–1941)

Arthur Hinton (20 November 1869 – 11 August 1941) was an English composer and conductor. His wife was the internationally famous pianist Katharine Goodson, who gave the first performance of his Piano Concerto in D minor in 1905.

== Career ==
Born at Beckenham in Kent, Hinton was educated at Shrewsbury School. He studied at the Royal Academy of Music, with Prosper Sainton (violin) and F W Davenport (composition). Granville Bantock was a contemporary there. He stayed on at the Academy as a sub-professor, before travelling to Munich for further study with Josef Rheinberger (and after his death Karel Navrátil), extending his trip with periods in Vienna and Rome. On his return he began conducting at various London theatres.

Hinton met the pianist Katherine Goodson while he was in Vienna, and after returning to England they married in 1903. Although sharing a close marriage, both of them travelled widely for their respective careers and there were no children. His compositional activity slowed down as he took on more responsibilities as an examiner for the Associated Board. In this capacity he visited Australia twice, as well as Canada and Jamaica, and he also spent time in America, where Goodson's advocacy helped gain him some recognition and publication.

Hinton also did some composition teaching at the Royal Academy of Music, where his pupils included William Alwyn. His address in London was 14 St. John's Wood Road. However, the house was destroyed by a bomb in 1941. According to the pianist Mark Hambourg:

I remember the house of my friend Katherine Goodson, the distinguished pianist, being completely destroyed by a high explosive, all except her two grand pianos which stood up back to back on the platform in her ruined studio, unharmed and impassive.

The couple subsequently established a house in Rottingdean, West Sussex, where Hinton died shortly afterwards. Goodson remained there, and two years later that house also suffered bomb damage.

== Compositions ==
Hinton was one of the composers featured in Granville Bantock's concert of new music by himself and his friends, put on at Queen's Hall on 15 December 1896. (Other composers included in this group were William Wallace, Reginald Steggall, Stanley Hawley (1867-1916) and Henry Erskine Allon). His Symphony No 1 in Bb was performed in August 1894 while he was in Munich with Rheinberger, and the Symphony No 2 in C minor was played at the Royal College of Music in 1903. A fantasia, The Triumph of Cæsar, was first played at the Queen's Hall in 1906.

Katharine Goodson gave the first performance of Hinton's Piano Concerto in D minor on 1 November 1905 at the Queen's Hall, and she also gave the first performances of his Trio in D Minor (at the Bechstein Hall in 1903), Piano Quintet in G minor (1910), Rhapsody (1911) and various shorter solo piano works. Clifford Curzon was also an enthusiast of the Piano Concerto, performing it at a Dan Godfrey Bournemouth concert in 1925. There was a modern revival of the Concerto by the Lambeth Orchestra with soloist Christopher Fifield in 2002. (The Lambeth Orchestra also revived the Symphony No 1). The premiere recording of the Piano Quintet was issued by Dutton Vocalion in 2021.

His Three Orchestral Scenes from Keats's Endymion were given at the Henry Wood Proms in 1907 and 1919, and also performed in America. Other works include the opera Tamara (composed while he was in Rome), two children's operettas (The Disagreeable Princess and St Elizabeth's Roses), Chant des Vagues for cello and orchestra (which achieved frequent performances), a Suite for violin and piano (1903), the Violin Sonata (1903, played by Émile Sauret), the six movement piano suite A Summer Pilgrimage (1916), and dramatic vocal settings of Porphyria's Lover (Browning) and Epipsychidion (Shelley). His last orchestral work was the impressionistic Semele (1918) for mezzo-soprano and orchestra. Hinton's surviving scores and parts are held at the Guildhall School of Music and Drama.
