= 1905 in British music =

This is a summary of 1905 in music in the United Kingdom.

== Events ==
- 2 January – Hans Richter conducts the Hallé Orchestra in Sibelius’ Second Symphony, the first performance in Britain of any Sibelius symphony.
- 15 February – The first two Dante Rhapsodies, Op. 92 by Charles Villiers Stanford ('Beatrice' and 'Capaneo'), are performed for the first time in the Bechstein Hall by Percy Grainger. The third, 'Francesca', is performed at the next concert on 25 March.
- 27 February – The Knights of the Road, an operetta by Sir Alexander Mackenzie, is produced in London at the Palace Theatre.
- 1 March – Incidental music to The Clouds (Aristophanes) by Hubert Parry is performed for the first time at the University of Oxford.
- 2 March – The first performance of York Bowen‘s Concertstück for Clarinet, Horn, String Quartet and Piano takes place at the Aeolian Hall in London with the composer at the piano.
- 8 March – Sir Edward Elgar conducts the London Symphony Orchestra in the first performance of his Introduction and Allegro for string quartet and string orchestra, and of his third Pomp and Circumstance March. Arnold Bax is in the audience.
- 10 March – Thomas Dunhill‘s Piano Quintet in C minor, op 20, is first performed at the Bechstein Hall.
- 16 March – In the first of a series of Birmingham lectures entitled A Future for English Music, Edward Elgar attacks some current English composers, without actually naming them, and points to the poor reputation that English music has abroad. Formerly friends, Elgar and Stanford cease communication.
- March – Percy Grainger attends a lecture by Lucy Broadwood and becomes interested in collecting folk songs.
- 4 April – The first performance of an orchestral work by Arnold Bax, Connemara Revel, is performed at the Queen’s Hall, as part of a student concert put on by the Royal Academy of Music.
- 11 April – Percy Grainger visits Brigg in Lincolnshire and notes down his first folks songs.
- 24 April – The incidental music Pan’s Anniversary (Jonson) by Ralph Vaughan Williams is performed for the first time at Bancroft Gardens, Stratford-upon-Avon conducted by the composer. Gustav Holst contributes orchestrations of keyboard music and traditional melodies.
- 20 May – The Capriccio No 1 for piano by Frank Bridge is performed for the first time in the Bechstein Hall. soloist Mark Hambourg.
- 9 June – Edward Elgar and his wife board The Deutschland at Dover for a voyage to America. They arrive in New York six days later.
- 15 June – A Sea Idyll for piano by Frank Bridge is performed for the first time, in the Bechstein Hall.
- 28 June – Edward Elgar receives an honorary doctorate at Yale University. Yale music professor, Horatio Parker plays Pomp and Circumstance March No 1 on the organ.
- 29 June – The Mystic Trumpeter, Op. 18 for soprano and orchestra by Gustav Holst, setting Walt Whitman, is performed for the first time in Queen’s Hall, conducted by the composer.
- 11 July – Edward Elgar and his wife board ship in New York bound for Liverpool.
- 24 July – At the Grand Hotel, Eastbourne, Claude Debussy begins a five-week stay (until 30 August), escaping the scandal at home surrounding his broken marriage. His pregnant mistress, Emma Bardac, accompanies him. While there (in Suite 200, now known as the Debussy Suite), he completed the orchestration of La Mer and made corrections to the score. The first performance takes place in Paris on 15 October, the UK premiere has to wait until 1 February 1908. Debussy also completes another “water” piece while in Eastbourne, Reflets dans l’eau.
- 28 August – The first performance of Scottish composer Hamish MacCunn‘s dramatic cantata The Wreck of the Hesperus, setting words by Longfellow, tales place at the London Coliseum. There are multiple further performances between August and October.
- 19 September – The fifth symphonic poem of Scottish composer William Wallace is given at the Queen’s Hall, London.
- 21 October – The Fantasia on British Sea Songs, arranged by Sir Henry Wood to commemorate the centenary of the Battle of Trafalgar, is performed for the first time, by the Queen's Hall Orchestra at a Promenade Concert.
- 25 October – The first performance of Bohemian Songs for baritone and orchestra by Joseph Holbrooke is conducted by the composer at the Norwich Festival.
- 26 October – The Pied Piper of Hamelin, a cantata by Hubert Parry, setting the poem by Robert Browning, is performed for the first time in Norwich.
- 29 October – The first concert given by London's New Symphony Orchestra, a player-run orchestra formed mainly from graduates of the Royal College of Music from the 1890s, takes place at the Coronet Theatre in Notting Hill. The NSO, associated with the early career of Thomas Beecham, becomes a specialist recording orchestra, and the "house" orchestra of the Gramophone Company between 1909 and 1930.
- 2 December – At the invitation of Granville Bantock, Jean Sibelius makes his first visit to England, conducting his Symphony No 1 and Finlandia in Liverpool.
- 14 December – The first performance of Ralph Vaughan Williams’ Piano Quintet in C minor takes place at the Aeolian Hall.
- date unknown – German-born George Henschel becomes organist of the German Embassy Church in London.

== Popular music ==
- 26 June – Music hall stars Frank Leo and Sable Fern are married in Southwark, and form a double act, two years after the suicide of her estranged husband Walter "Watty" Allan created a scandal.
- "I Love a Lassie", by Harry Lauder
- "Welcome Home, Sailor Boy!", by C. W. Murphy

== Classical music: new works ==
- Benjamin Dale – Piano Sonata
- Frederick Delius
  - A Mass of Life (part 1)
  - Violin Sonata no 1
- Edward Elgar – Introduction and Allegro for Strings
- Charles Villiers Stanford – Serenade in F major
- Ralph Vaughan Williams – Songs of Travel
- Haydn Wood – Phantasy String Quartet

== Opera ==
- Amherst Webber – Fiorella

== Musical theatre ==
- 30 May – The Spring Chicken, with music by Ivan Caryll and Lionel Monckton and lyrics by Adrian Ross, Percy Greenbank and George Grossmith, opens at the Gaety Theatre; it runs for 401 performances.
- 31 August – The White Chrysanthemum, by Leedham Bantock, Arthur Anderson and Howard Talbot, premièred in Newcastle the previous year, opens at the Criterion Theatre in London's West End, where it runs for 179 performances.

== Births ==
- 2 January – Michael Tippett, composer (died 1998)
- 5 February – Clifton Parker, theatre and film composer (died 1989)
- 11 March – Michael Carr, composer and songwriter (died 1968)
- 5 April – Charles Proctor, conductor, pianist, composer, (died 1996)
- 2 May – Alan Rawsthorne, composer (died 1971)
- 2 May – Mátyás Seiber (died 1960)
- 23 August – Constant Lambert, composer (died 1951)
- 7 November – William Alwyn, composer (died 1985)
- 30 October – Christian Darnton, composer (died 1981)
- 21 November – Ted Ray, comedian and violinist (died 1977)
- 31 December – Jule Styne, London-born songwriter (died 1994)
- date unknown – Fred Hartley, pianist, conductor and composer of light music (died 1980)

== Deaths ==
- 12 February – Edward Dannreuther, Strasbourg-born pianist, founder of the English Wagner Society (b. 1844)
- 11 April – David Braham, musical theatre composer (born 1834)
- 29 June – Herbert Stephen Irons, organist and composer, 71
- 20 September – Walter Cecil Macfarren, pianist, composer and conductor, 79
- 18 October – Emmie Owen, operatic soprano and actress, 33 (hepatic cirrhosis gastric ulcer)
- 9 December – Henry Holmes, composer and violinist (b. 1839)

== See also ==
- 1905 in the United Kingdom
