= Worksop Town Hall =

Municipal building in Worksop, Nottinghamshire, England

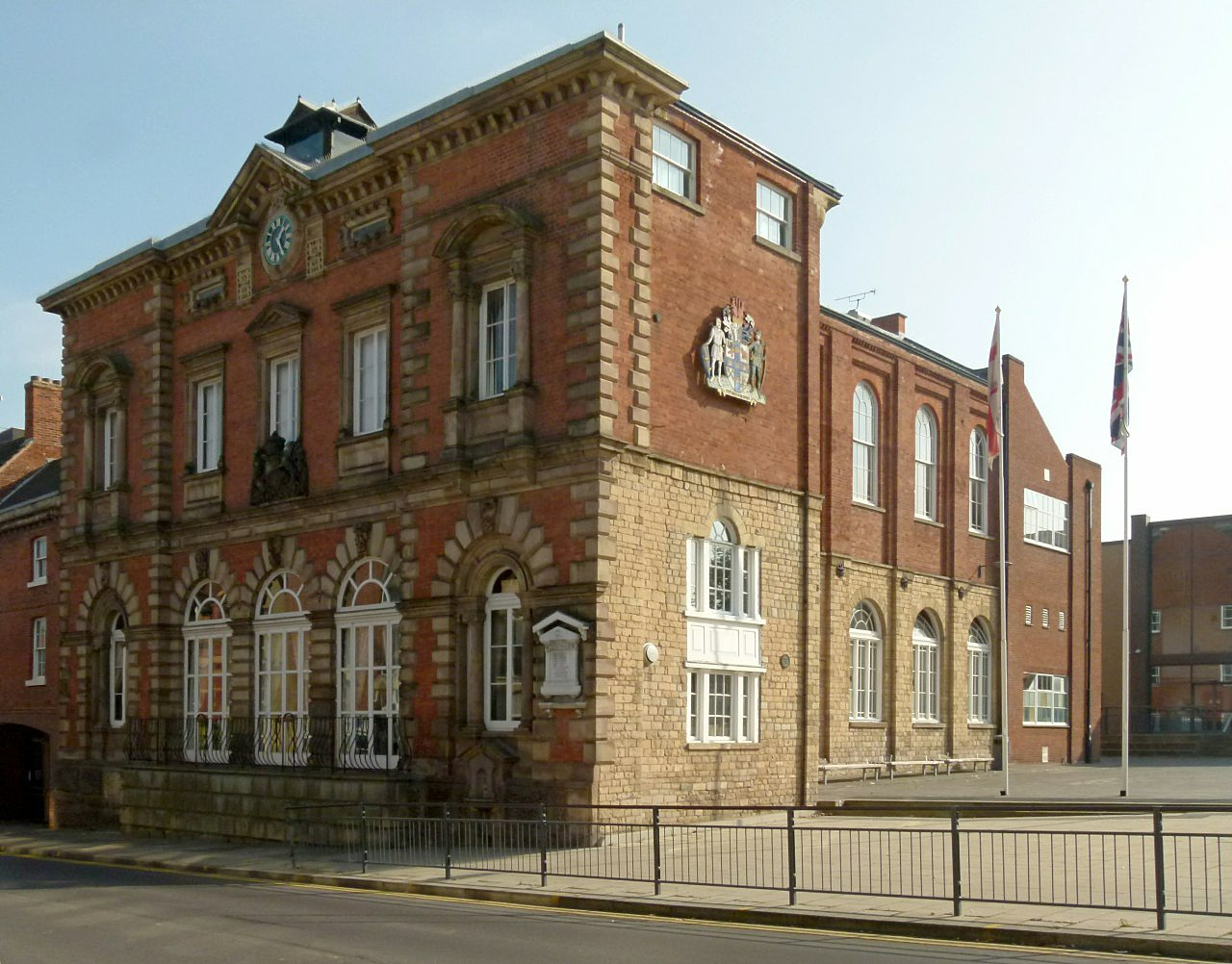
- Worksop Town Hall

- Shown in Nottinghamshire
- 53.3018°N 1.1241°W
- Location: Potter Street, Worksop

History
- Built: 1851

Site notes
- Architect: Isaac Charles Gilbert
- Architectural style: Italianate style

Listed Building – Grade II
- Official name: Worksop Town Hall
- Designated: 13 February 1967
- Reference no.: 1045762

Worksop Town Hall is a municipal building in Potter Street, Worksop, Nottinghamshire, England. The town hall, which was the headquarters of Worksop Borough Council, is a Grade II listed building. It is used for meetings of Bassetlaw District Council, whose main offices are in an adjoining building.

== History ==
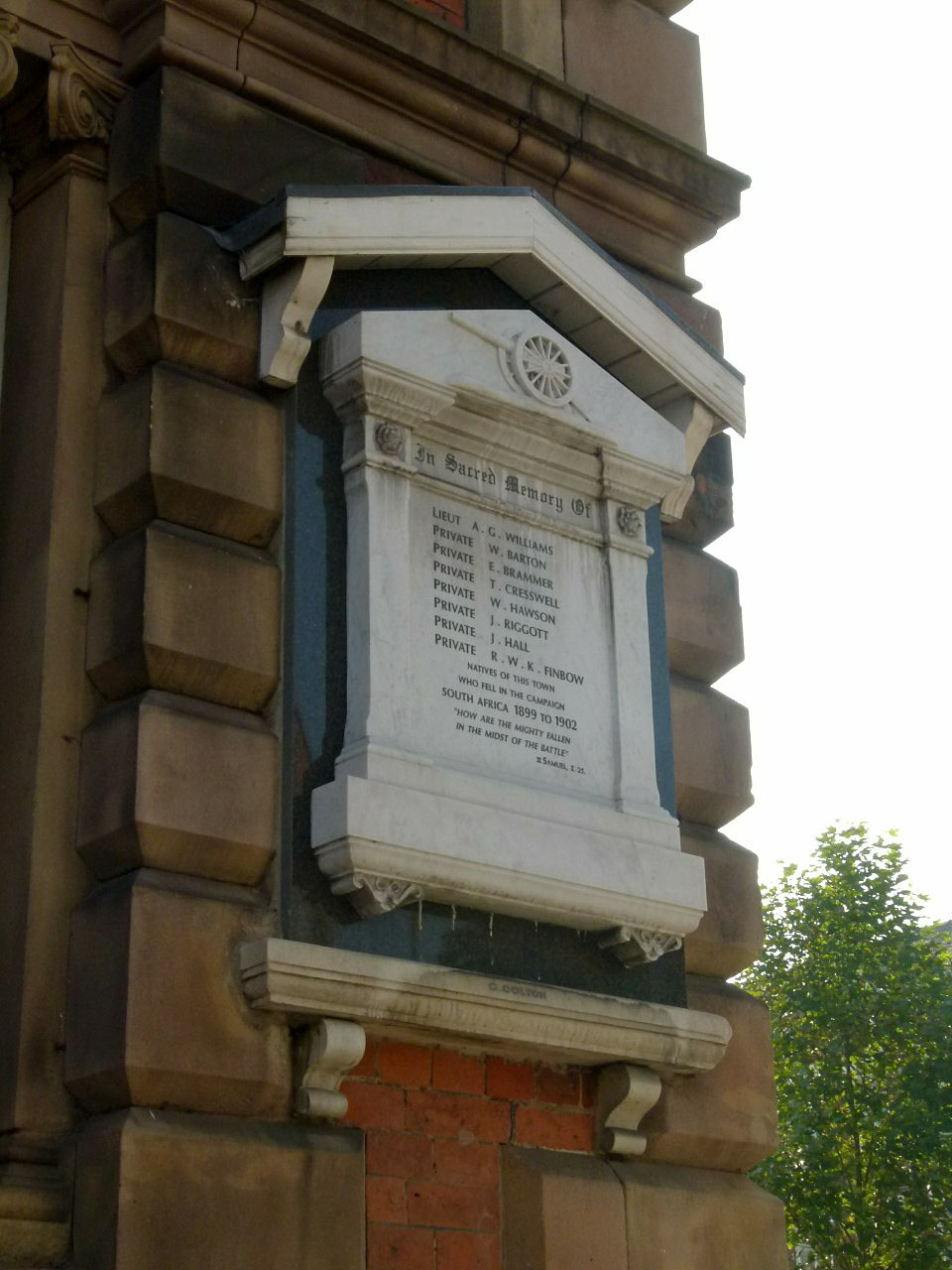
The war memorial on the façade of the building

The building was originally commissioned by a group of local investors who invested £5,000 to establish a corn exchange: the site they selected had been occupied by a row of houses. The new corn exchange was designed by Isaac Charles Gilbert in the Italianate style, built in red brick with stone dressings and was officially opened with an event attended by the lord of the manor, the Duke of Newcastle, in July 1851.

The design involved a symmetrical main frontage with five bays facing onto Potter Street with the end bays slightly projected forward; the central section of three bays originally featured a flight of steps leading up to three doorways with carved keystones. The arms of the Duke of Newcastle, carved in stone, were installed on the front of the building. There was an aediculed casement window flanked by two hooded casement windows on the first floor, above which was an open pediment containing a clock ('made by Mr Barlow'), which had been donated by the Duke of Newcastle. The outer bays featured casement windows flanked by Ionic order colonettes supporting curved pediments and there was a central belfry on the roof. Internally, the principal rooms included a courtroom, which was used for petty sessions, and an assembly room, which was used by the county court. On the ground floor, alongside the corn exchange hall itself, a library was established for use by the Reading Society and by the Mechanics Institute.

The year after the building was completed Worksop was made a local board district following a significant increase in population, largely associated with coal mining. From its first meeting on 16 August 1852 the board met at the corn exchange. In the 1870s, a collapse in corn prices caused by international competition precipitated financial difficulties for the owners of the corn exchange, and so the local board acquired the building in 1882. Local board districts were reconstituted as urban districts in 1894. The library, which became accessible by the general public, relocated to Watson Road in 1902.

A war memorial to commemorate the lives of local service personnel who had died in the Second Boer War was designed and made by local sculptor, George Colton. It took the form of a Carrara marble tablet which was installed on the right hand side of the building and unveiled by Field Marshal Lord Grenfell on 1 August 1903. The area was advanced to the status of municipal borough with the town hall as its headquarters in 1931.

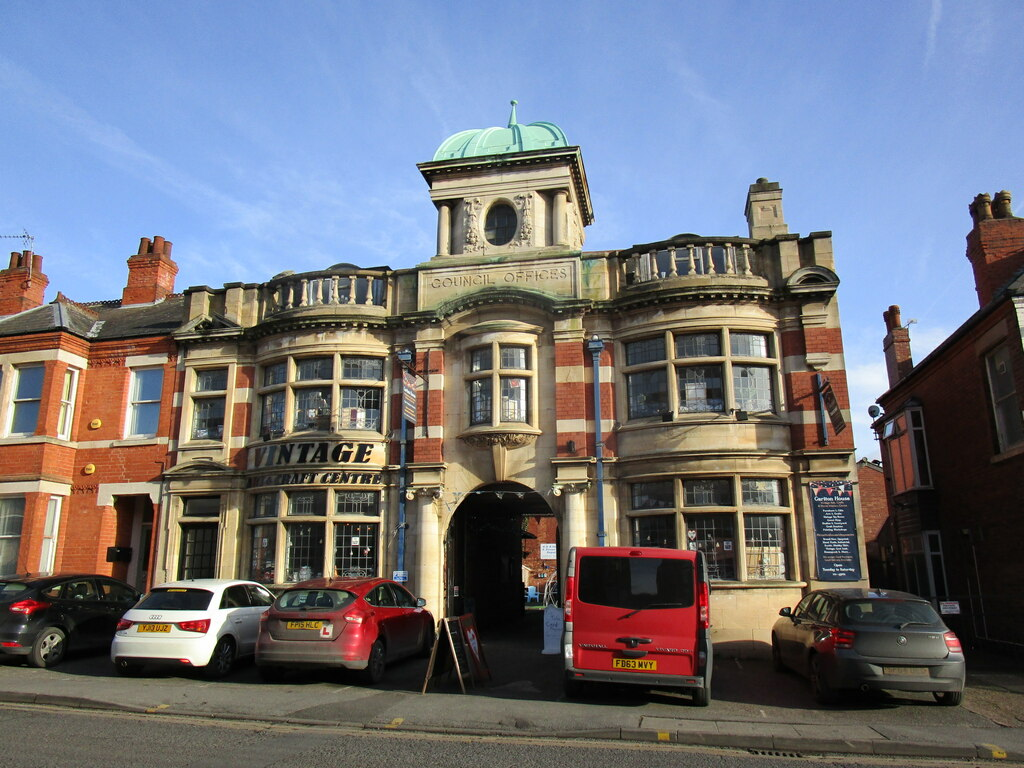
Former council offices, 36–38 Carlton Road

In 1910 the council bought the local water company, and supplemented the limited office space in the town hall with the water company's old offices at 36–38 Carlton Road, which had been built in 1900.

In the 1970s a two-storey, 18th century house to the east of the town hall on Potter Street was remodelled with an archway for vehicles replacing the old shopfront. At the same the steps leading up to the town hall were removed and the doorways replaced with three round headed windows – access to the building was then obtained through the new archway. Following local government reorganisation in 1974, the enlarged Bassetlaw District Council initially used both the town hall, 36–38 Carlton Road and the former Worksop Rural District Council offices at Highfield House on Carlton Road, supplemented by other offices in Bridge Street and Victoria Square. New council offices were built on Potter Street, immediately adjoining the east side of the town hall. The new building was opened by Queen Elizabeth II on 5 June 1981 and became known as the Queen's Building. The council holds its meetings both at Retford Town Hall and in Worksop Town Hall. A major programme of refurbishment works to the town hall was completed in August 2007.
