= James Cubitt =

British architect (1836–1914)

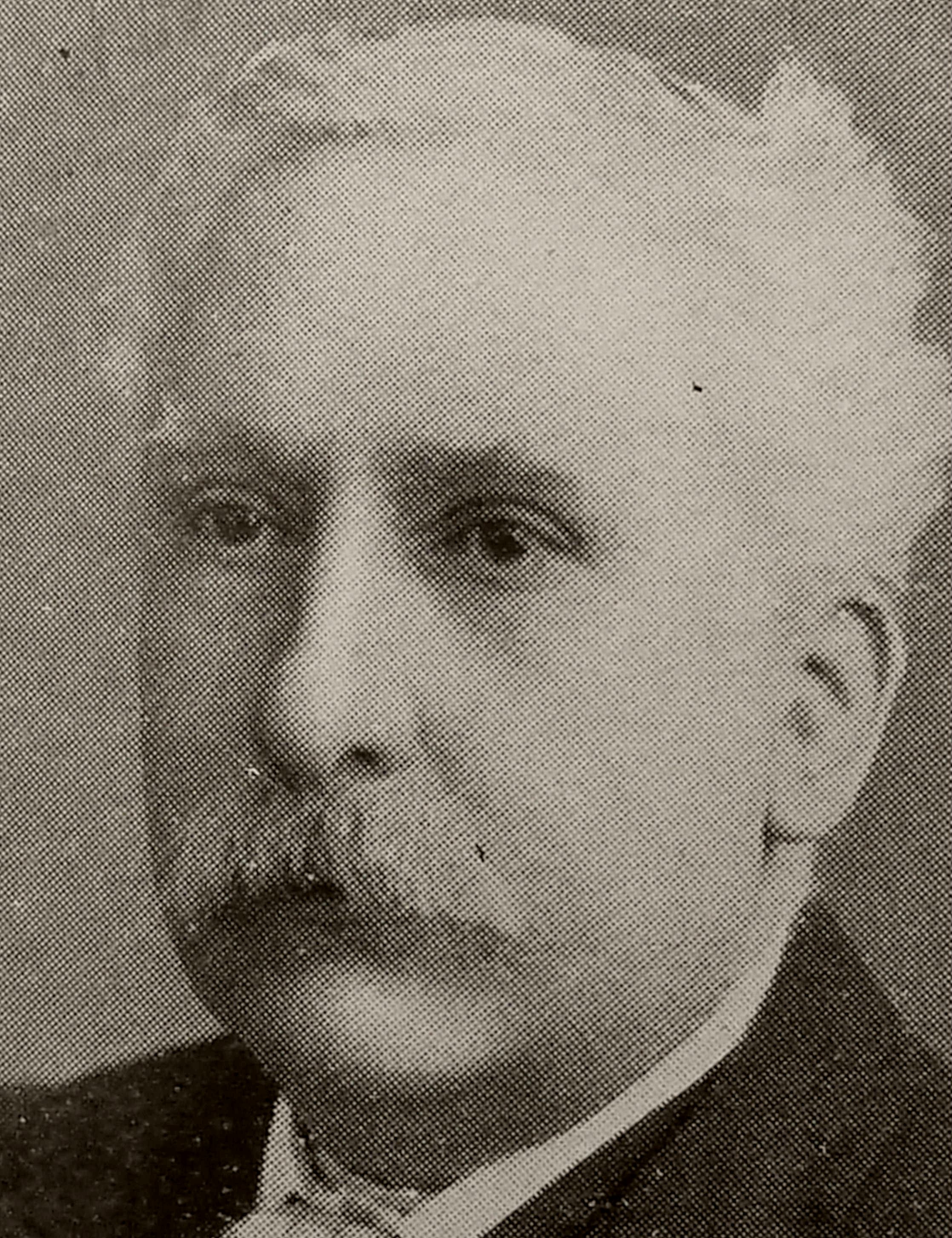
James Cubitt

James Cubitt (1836–1914) was a Victorian church architect specialising in building non-conformist chapels.

== Background ==
Cubitt was the son of a Baptist minister, from Norfolk who taught at Spurgeon's Pastor's College in South Norwood Hill — then on the outskirts of London.

== Career ==
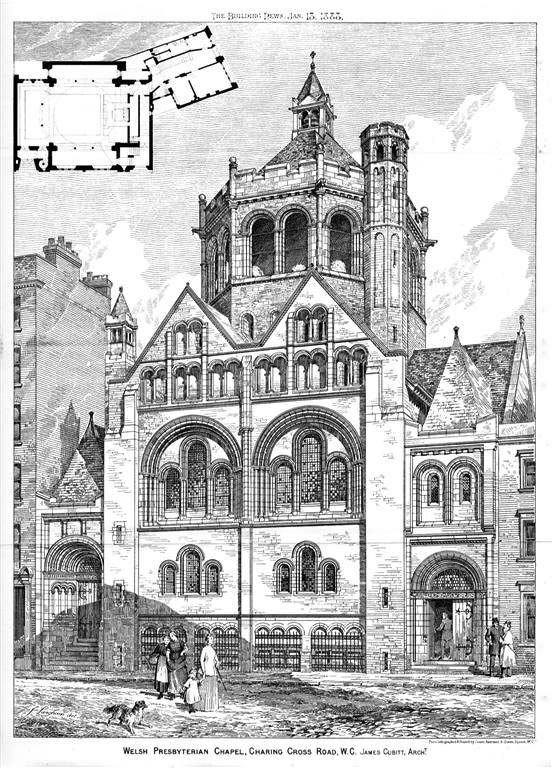
The former Welsh Presbyterian Chapel in Charing Cross Road in London. It is now being developed by arts charity Stone Nest.

Cubitt was articled to the firm of Isaac Charles Gilbert, in Nottingham (1851–56) and joined W. W. Pocock building chapels for the Wesleyans. From 1862, he formed his own office, forming a partnership with Henry Fuller in 1868.

=== Architectural philosophy ===
Cubitt's philosophy was laid out in his book, Church Design for Congregations. He attacked as obsolete the traditional nave and aisle design. When the "columns are thick or moderately thick, it inevitably shuts out a multitude of people from the service ... When, on the other hand, its columns are thin, the inconvenience is removed, but the architecture is ruined ... The type as it remains is but a shadow of its former self – a medieval church in the last stage of starvation". Too many architects were failing the principal criteria of their brief: "to produce a grand and beautiful church in which everyone could see and hear the service". His chapels are built as broad uncluttered spaces around a central pulpit and Lord's table.

== Works and memorials ==
Cubitt lived most of his professional life at Loughton, where he built several private houses and three schools. He is commemorated by a blue plaque on Monghyr Cottage, 2 Traps Hill, Loughton, where he died, and was buried in an unmarked grave next to his wife in Loughton Cemetery.

== Works ==
=== Architectural designs ===
  - Emmanuel Congregational Church in Cambridge (1873)
  - Union Chapel, Islington (1877).
  - Church of the Redeemer, Edgbaston, Birmingham (1882)
  - Welsh Presbyterian Chapel on Charing Cross Road (1888)
  - Dulwich Grove United Reformed Church (formerly Congregational), East Dulwich London (1890).
  - Staples Road Junior School, Loughton (1888)
  - Sunnybank, nos 7-9 Woodbury Hill, Loughton, Essex (1889)
  - Streatham United Reformed Church (formerly Congregational) on Streatham High Road (1901)

=== Publications ===
- Cubitt, James (1870). Church Designs for Congregations. London: Crosby, Lockwood & Son. Archived from the original on 26 April 2009..
- Cubitt, James (1892). Nonconformist Church Building. London: James Clarke & Co. Archived from the original on 26 April 2009..
- Cubitt, James (1911). A Short Specification of Materials, Labour, and Goods, for Works Connected with Buildings. London: Crosby, Lockwood & Son..

== See also ==
- Dissenting Gothic
- Cubitt - James Cubitt is no relation to his contemporary engineers and master builders of the same name.
