= Charles Turner (English composer) =

British composer

Charles Turner (1907 – 1977) was an English composer and part-time spy, who took the last recorded British pre-World War II photographs of Adolf Hitler.

Born in the early 1900s, Turner's life changed when his father died and his godfather Henry Pelham, 7th Duke of Newcastle took care of the young boy. Turner attended Worksop College, the public school endowed by the Duke of Newcastle. He gained a place at Cambridge university to study music. In the late 1920s into the 1930s he became a broadcast composer and fluent German speaker.

In 1934 Turner made the first of a series of annual visits to the Wagner festival in Bayreuth in Bavaria. In 1938 the British secret service MI5, convinced war was imminent, needed to urgently examine and assess the German threat. Approached by mutual friend Alan Angles, later of the War Office and Directorate of Ministry of Aircraft Production, Turner was recruited to infiltrate Hitler's entourage at the 1939 Bayreuth Festival. Registered as a guest of the Führert, Turner was hosted by Dr Fritz streit Chairman of the Bavarian Chamber of Commerce, through whom he received an invitation to follow the Führer's itinerary on Wednesday 26 July 1939. This unexpected opportunity allowed Turner to photograph Hitler and his intimates throughout the day. He took photographs of Hitler and other leading Nazis including propaganda Minister Joseph Goebbels, Hitler's Deputy, Rudolf Hess and "Strength Through Joy" leader Dr Robert Ley. Turner subsequently delivered a report back to London which is still regarded as top secret, if indeed it still exists.

Having married in 1941 and started a family, Turner's work post war often took him to Moscow. Reportedly on one occasion he took his son on tour of a housing estate in a search for the British spy Kim Philby. This may mean that Turner was still working in the interests of British Intelligence. His son is at pains to say that his father may have gathered Intelligence but was never a spy.

The extent of his role for MI5: whether he was formally employed, or just an asset / occasional collaborator. The exact nature of his “spy” status is unclear.

Charles Turner died in 1977, and his photographs of Hitler were released to the public in 2007.
