= Moses Davies =

Welsh musician and composer

Moses Davies (1799 – 6 January 1866) was a Welsh musician and composer.

Davies was born in Defynnog, Brecknockshire (now in Powys), but in 1803 his parents moved to Merthyr Tydfil, where he grew up. He was an able singer and took to studying, and later teaching, music. In 1827 he was appointed precentor of the Calvinistic Methodist chapel in Pontmorlais. He was a pioneer of music in congregational churches in the Merthyr area and his innovative ideas saw women being used to sing treble parts. This provoked much opposition, and he resigned his post. However, in 1834 he was persuaded to resume his position and, except for a period in London (from 1842 to 1848), he remained in the post until retirement.

His compositions include 24 hymn-tunes, including "Bremhill", which was included in Caniadau Seion (R. Mills, 1840), and others included inTelyn Seion (Rosser Beynon) and Haleliwia (Griffith Harries).

He died in January 1866 and was buried in Cefn-coed-y-cymmer.

His son William was a noted sculptor, who used the pseudonym "Mynorydd". William's daughter, Mary Davies, was a singer and an important figure in the preservation of Welsh folk music.
