= Katharine Goodson =

English pianist (1872–1958)

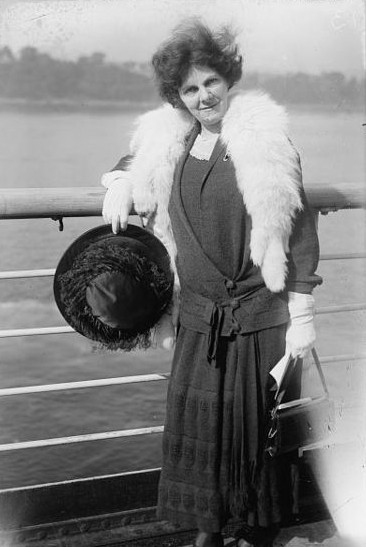

Katharine Goodson (18 June 1872 – 14 April 1958) was an English pianist.

Born in Watford, Goodson studied the piano at the Royal Academy of Music in London; she also worked with Theodor Leschetizky in Vienna. Her London debut took place on 16 January 1897. The tours of Europe which followed placed her in the front rank of British female pianists of the era. Goodson made her American debut on 18 January 1907, appearing as soloist with the Boston Symphony in a concert in the orchestra's home city.

== Life and career ==
=== Early life and training ===
Katharine Goodson was born in 1872, the second child of Charles and Sarah Goodson of Watford, England. She had two brothers, Arthur and Ernest, and a sister, Ethel.

As a child Goodson was reputed to play the violin better than the piano and it was her then teacher, noting that 'she had a perfect piano hand', who said that she should focus on the piano 'rather than master neither'.

At 12, having already made several appearances in the English provinces, Goodson entered the Royal Academy of Music, studying under Oscar Beringer between 1886 and 1892. After an invitation to play for the renowned pianist Ignacy Jan Paderewski, she was introduced to his former teacher Theodor Leschetizky in Vienna, himself once a student of Beethoven's own friend and pupil, Carl Czerny. Goodson spent four years studying with Leschetizky and despite having previously lost out on a scholarship at the Royal Academy of Music, her performance of the Tchaikowsky Concerto halfway through her studies so impressed Leschestizky that he refused to take any payment for her final two years.

=== Early career ===
On leaving Leschetizky in 1896, Goodson was introduced to the conductor and violinist Eugène Ysaÿe and played with him in Brussels. This forged a meeting with the American violinist Maud Powell, with whom she played numerous concerts, paving the way for engagements across Belgium, Germany and the South of France and rapidly establishing her presence in continental Europe. Goodson based herself in London through this period, debuting there in 1897, in Berlin in 1899 and in Vienna in 1900. Between 1902 and 1904 she toured extensively with the Czech violinist and composer Jan Kubelík. When her sister Ethel, who had stayed with her during much of her time in Vienna, went to Budapest to become the governess to the son of Count István Tisza, the Prime Minister of Hungary, Goodson went to stay with academic and parliamentarian Sir Martin Conway, (later 1st Baron Conway of Allington) and his wife Katrina, Lady Conway, at their London house.

It was Leschetizky who again sought to further Goodson's career with an introduction to the conductor Artúr Nikisch. At the concert hall Gewandhaus, Leipzig she played Schumann's 'Pappillons' and Grieg's Concerto in A minor. After the performance, Nikisch congratulated her: “I have known many artists during my life, and many soloists, but the true musicians I can count on the fingers of one hand, d'Albert, Ysäye, Paderewski, and to those you belong, Miss Goodson.”

=== American debut ===
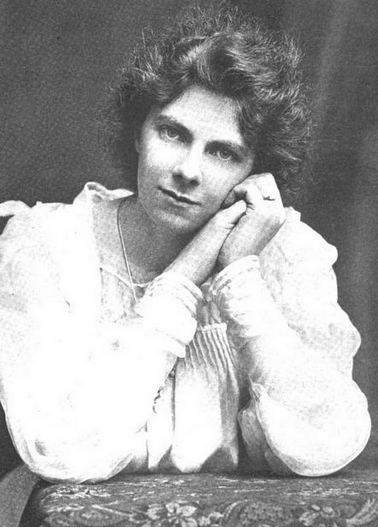
Katharine Goodson, from a 1907 publication announcing her American debut.

Nikisch and Goodson toured widely together across Germany, and on her return to London the two met again, whereupon Nikisch arranged for her debut engagement with the Boston Symphony Orchestra.

The appearance nearly didn't happen. While making the Atlantic crossing, two days from Boston, her ship encountered a hurricane and a piece of ice, broken away from icebergs further north, crashed through the heavy plate glass of Goodson's stateroom window as she was resting before dinner, landing within a foot of her head.

Having narrowly avoided injury, her Boston unveiling came on 18 January 1907 to wide acclaim. The Boston Transcript wrote: “Her interpretation was poetic, supplying that indispensable sense of imaginative atmosphere essential to Grieg, while containing precisely that right pitch of bravura abandon, of dramatic sensuousness which the concerto demands. Her rhythm is incisive, full of fire, and yet, when the occasion demands, elastic.” Violinist Franz Kneisel was present and immediately engaged her to play with his Kneisal Quartette at further concerts in Boston and New York. Through this relationship Goodson became instrumental in the American popularisation of her composer husband Arthur Hinton.

She performed many premieres of music by Hinton worldwide, giving the first performances of his Piano Concerto on 1 November 1905 at Queen's Hall Other Hinton premieres included the Piano Quintet, the Trio in D Minor (at the Bechstein Hall in 1903), and later his Rhapsody and the suite A Summer Pilgrimage.

=== International career ===
Hinton's own work as a conductor and examiner equally favoured Goodson's international career. Following her second American tour and a brief spell back in London, Hinton was invited to go to Australia to conduct the music exams for its Royal Schools of Music and a tour there was arranged for Goodson. Despite some trepidation on her part – noting that both Paderewski and pianist María Teresa Carreño had recently toured there, while their peer Mark Hambourg was halfway through his third Australian tour – she was greeted with enthusiasm.

A third American tour immediately followed where her appearances included working with the conductors Vasily Safonov and Ossip Gabrilowitsch. With violinist Bronisław Huberman and cellist Felix Salmond she contributed to the Beethoven Association concerts, raising funds for the association's publication of Thayer's Life of Beethoven.

It was after her fourth American tour that Goodson furthered her horizons with a tour of Jamaica in early 1915. Critical acclaim was again poured on her, although it was a night encounter at Parson Green's Mission House in a roofless room that perhaps made the greater impression on Goodson. She wrote: “We had ten rat-bats in our room that night, innumerable lizards on the walls and mosquitoes ad infinitum. We wrapped our heads in scarves, but I can truthfully say I do not think I lost consciousness for five minutes during that longest night I have ever spent, for it was a succession of swoops, and creeps, and bites! Ugh!”

Goodson spent much of 1916 in North America, performing at fundraising concerts for the Red Cross and Canadian prisoners of war. In all, her international career took her to North America over a total of seven separate tours, including two world tours that she shared with the Australian soprano Dame Nellie Melba. She also toured Java and Sumatra and developed a presence in the Nordic region with a tour of Norway, Sweden and Finland.

In May 1918 Goodson claimed to become the first woman to give a recital at the Albert Hall, London, playing a Chopin programme on behalf of the Kensington War Hospital Supply Depot. The Pall Mall Gazette noted: “Her reception was extraordinarily enthusiastic and the stage was literally inundated with bouquets.”

=== Later career ===
Goodson's international presence remained dominant throughout the 1920s and 1930s. The latter decade also brought with it Goodson's first experience playing with the conductor Sir Thomas Beecham, in 1931. The two maintained a lasting professional relationship, based on a mutual appreciation. Following Beecham's "Vocal Birthday Tribute to Delius" in 1932, the Daily Sketch noted: “Goodson played the solo part so attractively that once Sir Thomas was caught by a sudden pause singing his own satisfaction over it.” It was also Beecham, who in 1936, encouraged Goodson to diversify and tour performing a harpsichord concerto. The Daily Telegraph wrote: “For a famous Leschetizky pupil, it must have seemed like exchanging big guns for bows and arrows. Miss Goodson seemed to have taken to the new arm as to the manner born”.

The Second World War interrupted Goodson's later career, during which she experienced the destruction of her London home in the Blitz, followed shortly afterwards by the death of her husband in 1941, and then further extensive bomb damage to her country home in Rottingdean, West Sussex two years later. Nevertheless, in 1944–1945 she returned to the piano to play with the conductors Sir Adrian Boult, Sir Henry Wood and Basil Cameron.

In April 1947 Goodson appeared again with Beecham, shortly before making her first television appearance, which she swiftly followed by a return to radio in an appearance with the BBC Scottish Orchestra under the conductor Ian Whyte. Although Goodson made few broadcasts and fewer recordings, leaving her legacy largely unheard to contemporary audiences, those recordings that do exist remain well regarded.

Goodson died in London in 1958.

== Family, marriage and friends ==
=== Family ===
Goodson – known to her family as 'Kaigee' – was supported in her career by her family from a young age. She wrote of losing a scholarship to the Royal Academy of Music as a girl and the words her father spoke afterwards: “‘Will you memorise something for me tonight and never forget it?’ I smiled at him through my tears. ‘Of course I will, Daddy. What is it?’ ‘Failures,’ he said, holding up his fingers for emphasis, ‘are with heroic minds the stepping stones to success.’” Goodson claimed these words helped maintain her resolve throughout her career.

Her younger sister Ethel, who accompanied Goodson to Vienna, was especially close to her and Goodson was bereft when, early in her career, Ethel moved to Hungary to become a governess, claiming that without her “there seemed no one to whom I could have a real heart to heart talk and who would understand my longings and aspirations”.

Her mother, too, was close, once writing effusively to Goodson: “If I have really been able to help you one little bit, the comfort, the joy is all mine, for you know how, did it belong to me, I would lay the whole world of wealth and love and glory at your feet. You should be a Queen of Fairyland forevermore.”

Goodson herself evidently had a playful side. En route to Boston for her American debut she and her husband dined with some elderly society ladies, who enquired after their profession. For some days, to the horror of the Bostonians, the two musicians kept up the pretence that they were circus performers and had a camel called Gertrude in the ship's hold.

On arrival in Boston, a newspaper printed a light-hearted story about an expensive and naive trip Goodson had made to a Monte Carlo casino. Two elderly spinsters promptly returned their tickets saying that “they did not know that Katharine Goodson was that kind of girl!” Goodson wrote: “I felt that I had not only lost my money but my reputation too.”

=== Marriage ===
During Goodson's time in Vienna Arthur Hinton, a fellow Royal Academian and London friend (with whom she had played in the Academy Orchestra), was studying in the city under Karl Navratil and the two spent much of their time together. Later Hinton went to Munich to study composition with Josef Rheinberger. When they both returned to London, Hinton became a regular visitor of the Conways, with whom Goodson lived as she sought to establish her career. The two married in 1903. She said of him: “I think Arthur Hinton must have mesmerized me into marrying him, for I had decided never, never to marry; everybody thought my career might be spoilt should I do so, but somehow or other our minds and hearts seemed to have been drawing ever nearer. We had the same ideals of work and living, loving the same artistic life, the same surroundings, even to books and furniture, and always nearly the same people.”

The two travelled widely together in their career, never having children, but sharing a close marriage. Hinton wrote to her during her American tour of 1930: “I am filled with the same love, which neither time, nor space, nor anything that life may bring will ever have power to change”.

Hinton died in 1941. A year later, as part of a long eulogy, Goodson wrote of him in terms of their shared passion: “I keep you where the music is, that is the best place”.

=== Friends, colleagues and pupils ===
Goodson's career introduced her to the elite of the musical, artistic and political worlds. She counted among her musical friends her mentor Leschetizky – who called her 'De Liebe Katie', Paderewski, Nikisch, Nellie Melba, Dohnányi, Carreño, Beecham, Henry Wood, Mathilde Marchesi, Ysaÿe, Elgar, Gabrilowitsch and his wife Clara Clemens. Other friends in the arts included the actress Eleonora Duse and Clemens' father Samuel, better known under his pen name, Mark Twain.

Of Melba, who was known for having a demanding personality, Goodson spoke warmly: “I had heard people say that the great singer was cold and unresponsive; she seemed to me exactly the reverse, a generous impulsive ardour continually bubbled forth, combined with much fun and merriment, which frequently showed itself when she was free of conventional surroundings”.

Goodson also carried on the Leschetizky tradition, writing extensively on piano technique as well as taking on pupils of her own, including Sir Clifford Curzon and Mark Hambourg's acclaimed daughter, Michal Augusta Hambourg. The Canadian writer Elizabeth Smart also studied with her.
