= Symphony No. 9 (Vaughan Williams) =

Musical work, premiered in 1958

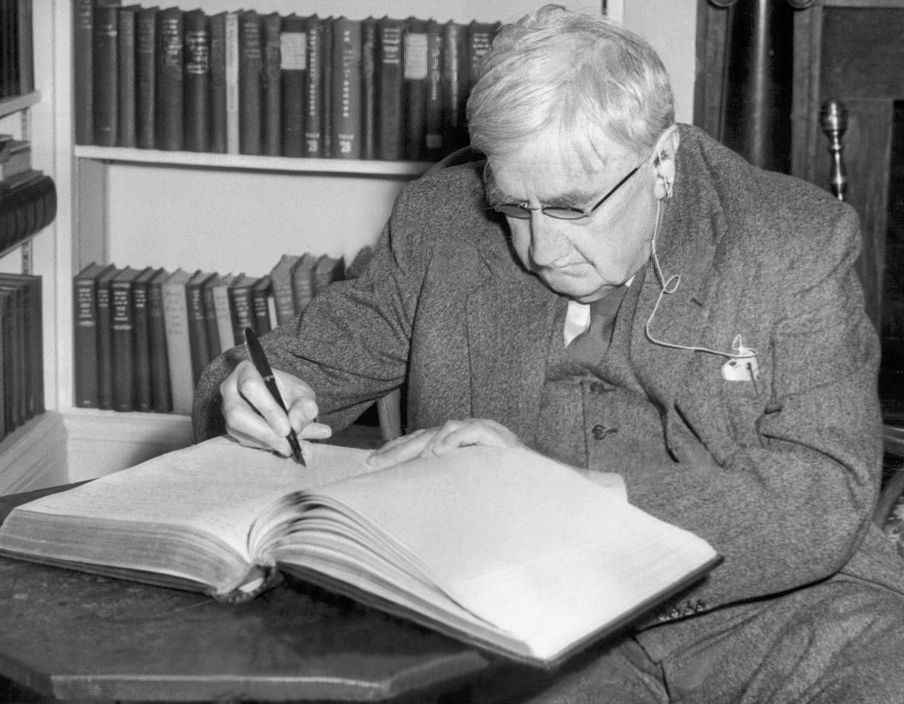
Vaughan Williams in 1955

The Symphony No. 9 in E minor was the last symphony completed by the English composer Ralph Vaughan Williams. He composed it during 1956 and 1957, and it was given its premiere performance in London by the Royal Philharmonic Orchestra conducted by Sir Malcolm Sargent on 2 April 1958, in the composer's eighty-sixth year. The work was received respectfully but, at first, without great enthusiasm. Its reputation has subsequently grown, and the symphony has entered the repertoire, in the concert hall and on record, with the majority of recordings from the 1990s and the 21st century.

In his early sketches for the symphony, Vaughan Williams made explicit reference to characters and scenes in Thomas Hardy's Tess of the d'Urbervilles. By the time the symphony was complete he had deleted the programmatic details, but musical analysts have found many points in which the work nonetheless evokes the novel.

== Background and first performances ==
By the mid-1950s Vaughan Williams, in his eighties, was regarded as the Grand Old Man of English music, greatly as he disliked the term. Between 1910 and 1955 he had composed eight symphonies, and early in 1956, before the premiere of the Eighth, he began to think about and make sketches for a ninth.

During the early stages of the composition of the symphony, Vaughan Williams conceived first a musical depiction of Salisbury, the Plain and Stonehenge and then an evocation of Thomas Hardy's Tess of the d'Urbervilles, set in the same surroundings. The programmatic elements disappeared as work progressed. Existing sketches show that in the early stages of composition certain passages related to specific people and events in the novel: in some of the manuscripts the first movement is headed "Wessex Prelude" and the heading "Tess" appears above sketches for the second movement. By the time the work was complete, the composer was at pains to characterise it as absolute music:

The second movement, Andante Sostenuto, seems to have no logical connection between its various themes. This has led some people to think that it must have a programme since apparently programme music need not be logical. It is quite true that the movement started off with a programme, but it got lost on the journey – so now, oh no, we never mention it – and the music must be left to speak for itself – whatever that may mean.

The work was commissioned by and dedicated to the Royal Philharmonic Society. It was complete by November 1957 when a piano arrangement was played to a group of the composer's friends, including the composers Arthur Bliss and Herbert Howells and the critic Frank Howes. A fortnight before the premiere, Vaughan Williams arranged (and paid for) a three-hour rehearsal at which the symphony was played through twice; after hearing the piece he made some minor adjustments in preparation for the premiere.

Sir Malcolm Sargent conducted the first public performance at a Royal Philharmonic Society concert at the Royal Festival Hall, London on 2 April 1958, the central item in the programme, between Kodály's Concerto for Orchestra and Berlioz's Harold in Italy. He again conducted the symphony on 5 August 1958 at a broadcast BBC Proms concert. The work received its North American premiere on 10 August, conducted by William Steinberg at the Vancouver International Festival. Leopold Stokowski conducted the US premiere at Carnegie Hall, New York, on 25 September, and Sir John Barbirolli conducted the Philadelphia Orchestra in the work in December of that year.

== Music ==
The orchestral forces required are:

- Woodwinds: piccolo, two flutes, two oboes, cor anglais, two clarinets (in B♭), bass clarinet (in B♭), two bassoons, contrabassoon, two alto saxophones (in E♭), tenor saxophone (in B♭)
- Brass: four horns (in F), two trumpets (in B♭), flugelhorn (in B♭), three trombones, tuba
- Percussion: timpani, side drum, tenor drum, bass drum, cymbals, triangle, large gong, tam-tam, deep bells, glockenspiel, xylophone, celesta
- Strings: two harps, and strings

The symphony is in four movements. Timings in performance vary considerably: at the premiere Sargent and the Royal Philharmonic took 30m 25s, which is nearer than most subsequent performances on record to the composer's metronome markings, but is felt by some critics to be too fast in places. (Note: Vaughan Williams's metronome markings for his scores have been called into question. He did not observe them himself when conducting his works, and was present at recordings by Boyd Neel and Sir Adrian Boult where he did not object to slower tempi than marked. Vaughan Williams's musical assistant Roy Douglas, who greatly disliked Sargent's brisk tempi, speculated that Vaughan Williams simply miscalculated because he did not possess a metronome.) In preparation for the first commercial recording of the work in August 1958, Sir Adrian Boult discussed the ending of the last movement with Vaughan Williams, which he felt was too abrupt. Vaughan Williams suggested that he could play that section "a good deal slower" if he wished while he considered Boult's suggestion that he add 20 or 30 measures. Timings of studio recordings of the work have ranged from 29m 45s (Kees Bakels, 1996) to 40m 43 (Andrew Manze, 2018), with 34 minutes or so a more typical duration.

=== I. Moderato maestoso ===
In the composer's published analysis the Moderato first movement is described as not in strict sonata form but obeying the general principles of statement, contrast and repetition. The symphony opens in E minor, in 4/4 time, with a held unison E in four octaves, followed by a slow theme for low brasses and winds over the sustained E. (Note: Vaughan Williams said that the theme had come to him after playing the organ part at the beginning of Bach's St Matthew Passion.) This leads to the first solo entrance of the three saxophones in a solemn theme in triads over a quiet E minor chord. The clarinets, accompanied by harp chords, introduce a gentler theme in G minor that elides into the G major that conventional sonata form would suggest. This returns in fuller form later in the movement, forming the recapitulation section, and now played by a solo violin, before the movement returns to the opening theme and ends with a saxophone cadence (à la Napolitaine, in the composer's phrase).

=== II. Andante sostenuto ===
The slow movement, marked Andante sostenuto, opens in G minor, 4/4 time, with a theme for the solo flügelhorn. According to the musicologist Alain Frogley and others, the composer's original programmatic conceptions are essentially unaltered in the score despite his deletion of the labelling of themes, and in the opening it is possible to hear the sound of the wind blowing through Stonehenge. Later in the movement the music evokes Tess, the pursuing constabulary, her arrest and the bell striking eight before her hanging. Vaughan Williams, avoiding mention of the original programme, describes the flügelhorn theme as "borrowed from an early work of the composer's, luckily long since scrapped, but changed so that its own father would hardly recognize it". (Note: A reference to The Solent (a work for chamber orchestra, composed 1902–03), according to a footnote.) He continues:

The episode which follows is a strong contrast; a barbaric march theme, against which there is a counter-theme. A sudden modulation to B-flat minor brings back a version of [the flügelhorn theme] followed by a romantic episode in triple time, played chiefly by the strings. ... Then a menacing stroke on the gong brings back a memory of [the flügelhorn theme] ... Then a quick crescendo leads to a restatement of [the march] played by the full force of the orchestra, which dies down again to softness, and the flügel horn and its tune are once more heard, this time with a counter subject below it on the clarinet.

The movement closes on a pianissimo chord of C major sustained across four bars.

=== III. Scherzo ===
The scherzo third movement is marked Allegro pesante, and moves between 6/8 and 2/4 time. After an opening fortissimo brass discord, accompanied by a rhythmic pattern on the side drum, the saxophones play the first main theme, which is followed by a second theme, in 2/4, and, reverting to 6/8, a third. A subsidiary theme is developed in canon. The music is interrupted by a repetition of the opening dissonance, out of which the solo B♭ saxophone and the side drum bring the movement to a quiet end.

=== IV. Finale ===
The last movement, marked Andante tranquillo, is in two distinct sections, the first in repeated binary form and the second a sonata allegro with coda. The first section begins with a long cantilena on the violins and then the violas, with clarinet counterpoint. The second theme, for horns, is followed by a repetition of both themes, before a short phrase that occurs throughout the movement introduces the second section, a viola theme, soft at first and becoming louder and contrapuntal, for full orchestra before ending on an E major triad, fortissimo but fading away to silence.

== Critical reception ==
According to Vaughan Williams's biographer Michael Kennedy, after the first performances, "there was no denying the coolness of the critics' reception of the music. Its enigmatic mood puzzled them, and more attention was therefore paid to the use of the flügel horn and to the flippant programme note." The flügelhorn player at the premiere remarked that all the press coverage was about the instrument, to the detriment of serious discussion of the symphony as a work. An example of what Kennedy describes as the composer's flippancy in his programme note concerns the instrumentation:

The usual symphony orchestra is used, with the addition of three saxophones and flügel horn. This beautiful and neglected instrument is not usually allowed in the select circles of the orchestra and has been banished to the brass band, where it is allowed to indulge in the bad habit of vibrato to its heart's content. While in the orchestra it will be obliged to sit up and play straight. The saxophones, also, are not expected, except possibly in one place in the scherzo, to behave like demented cats, but are allowed to be their own romantic selves.

In the American journal Notes, R. Murray Schafer commented that although most libraries would wish to acquire the score because of Vaughan Williams's reputation as a symphonist, "I find it difficult...to discover much more than a numerical value in the work". He complained about the saxophones and flügelhorn: "all this extra color seems to be employed simply in thickening the middle-orchestra texture. ... The formal mastery is still present, but I don't think it saves the work." Other critics in America were more impressed. In the Musical Courier, Gideon Waldrop described the symphony as "a work of beauty ... lyricism, sheer tonal beauty and thorough craftsmanship were in evidence throughout" and in The New York Times, Harold C. Schonberg wrote that "the symphony is packed with strong personal melody from beginning to end ... A mellow glow suffuses the work, as it does the work of many veteran composers who seem to gaze retrospectively over their careers ... the Ninth Symphony is a masterpiece".

In the decades following his death, the music of Vaughan Williams was to a considerable extent ignored by musical academics and critics, although not by the public: his music remained popular in the concert hall and on record. In the mid-1990s the critical and musicological tide turned in his favour. So far as the Ninth Symphony was concerned, the earlier view that it said nothing new began to be supplanted by the recognition that although it was, as The Times put it in 2008, "the synthesis and summation of all that had gone before", the music was visionary, violent, elusive and ambiguous. In 2011, in a note for the San Francisco Symphony, Larry Rothe wrote, "Like Beethoven's final symphony, this one portrays huge conflicts and superhuman striving. Then, in its midst, a light-drenched seascape unfolds, but the vision retreats as suddenly as it appeared. Vaughan Williams had not composed music so angry and assertive since his Sixth Symphony". Frogley and others believe that the work became better understood once the programmatic element became widely known.

== Recordings ==
Year	Orchestra	Conductor	Location	Ref
1958	Royal Philharmonic	Sir Malcolm Sargent	Royal Festival Hall, London	
1958	London Philharmonic	Sir Adrian Boult	Walthamstow Assembly Hall, London	
1958	"his [Stokowski's] Symphony Orchestra"	Leopold Stokowski	Carnegie Hall, New York	
1958	Orquestra Sinfónica Nacional de Portugal	Pedro de Freitas Branco	Teatro Nacional de São Carlos, Lisbon,	
1969	London Philharmonic	Sir Adrian Boult	Kingsway Hall, London	
1971	London Symphony	André Previn	Kingsway Hall	
1989	USSR State Symphony	Gennady Rozhdestvensky	Philharmonia Building, Leningrad	
1990	London Symphony	Bryden Thomson	St Jude's Church, Hampstead Garden Suburb, London	
1991	Philharmonia	Leonard Slatkin	EMI Abbey Road Studios, London	
1994	Royal Liverpool Philharmonic	Vernon Handley	Philharmonic Hall, Liverpool	
1995	BBC Symphony	Andrew Davis	St Augustine's, Kilburn, London	
1996	Bournemouth Symphony	Kees Bakels	Arts Centre, Poole	
2000	London Philharmonic	Bernard Haitink	Abbey Road	
2008	BBC Symphony	Sir Andrew Davis	Royal Albert Hall, London	
2016	Bergen Philharmonic	Sir Andrew Davis	Grieg Hall, Bergen	
2018	Royal Liverpool Philharmonic	Andrew Manze	Philharmonic Hall, Liverpool	
2021	The Hallé	Sir Mark Elder	Hallé St Peter's, Manchester	
2024	London Symphony	Sir Antonio Pappano	Barbican Hall, London	

== Notes, references and sources ==
=== Sources ===
- Culshaw, John (1981). Putting the Record Straight. London: Secker and Warburg. ISBN 978-0-436-11802-9.
- Frogley, Alain (January 1987). "Vaughan Williams and Thomas Hardy: 'Tess' and the Slow Movement of the Ninth Symphony". Music & Letters. 68 (1): 42–59. doi:10.1093/ml/68.1.42. JSTOR 736401. (subscription required)
- Frogley, Alain (2001). Vaughan Williams's Ninth Symphony. Oxford: Oxford University Press. ISBN 978-0-19-816284-1.
- Frogley, Alain; Aidan J. Thompson (2013). "Introduction". In Alain Frogley; Aidan J. Thomson (eds.). The Cambridge Companion to Vaughan Williams. Cambridge Companions to Music. Cambridge: Cambridge University Press. ISBN 978-1-107-65026-8.
- Horton, Julian (2013). "The Later Symphonies". In Alain Frogley; Aidan J. Thomson (eds.). The Cambridge Companion to Vaughan Williams. Cambridge: Cambridge University Press. ISBN 978-1-107-65026-8.
- Kennedy, Michael (1980) [1964]. The Works of Ralph Vaughan Williams (2nd ed.). Oxford: Oxford University Press. ISBN 978-0-19-315453-7.
- Kennedy, Michael (2013). "Fluctuations in the response to the music of Ralph Vaughan Williams". In Alain Frogley; Aidan J. Thomson (eds.). The Cambridge Companion to Vaughan Williams. Cambridge: Cambridge University Press. ISBN 978-1-107-65026-8.
- Manning, David (2008). Vaughan Williams on Music. Oxford: Oxford University Press. ISBN 978-0-19-518239-2.
- Pople, Anthony (1996). "Tallis and the Phantasy principle". In Alain Frogley (ed.). Vaughan Williams Studies. Cambridge: Cambridge University Press. ISBN 978-0-521-48031-4.
- Schwartz, Elliott (1982) [1964]. The Symphonies of Ralph Vaughan Williams. New York: Da Capo Press. ISBN 978-0-306-76137-9.
- Vaughan Williams, Ursula (1964). RVW: A Biography of Ralph Vaughan Williams. Oxford: Oxford University Press. ISBN 978-0-19-315411-7.
