= Joseph Hinton =

British composer and organist

Joseph Harold Hinton (1 January 1862 – 4 January 1941) was a British composer and organist.

Hinton was born in Clayton, Buckinghamshire. His teachers included Frederick Bridge of Westminster Abbey. In 1882 Hinton was appointed resident music-master at Blairlodge School in Polmont, Scotland, moving then in 1885 to be organist at Hyndland Church, Hillhead, Glasgow. His published compositions include a setting of De Profundis, a song titled Eldorado, and some anthems. In 1908 he published L'allegro, his op. 5, for string orchestra, with timpani ad lib. He was honorary secretary of the Glasgow Society of Musicians in 1909.

At least briefly from 1909 he lived at 7 Striven Gardens in Glasgow. In May 1910 he went to Canada, and worked in Ontario before heading west, to British Columbia. He died in Victoria, British Columbia, in 1941.
