= Isaac Charles Gilbert =

English architect

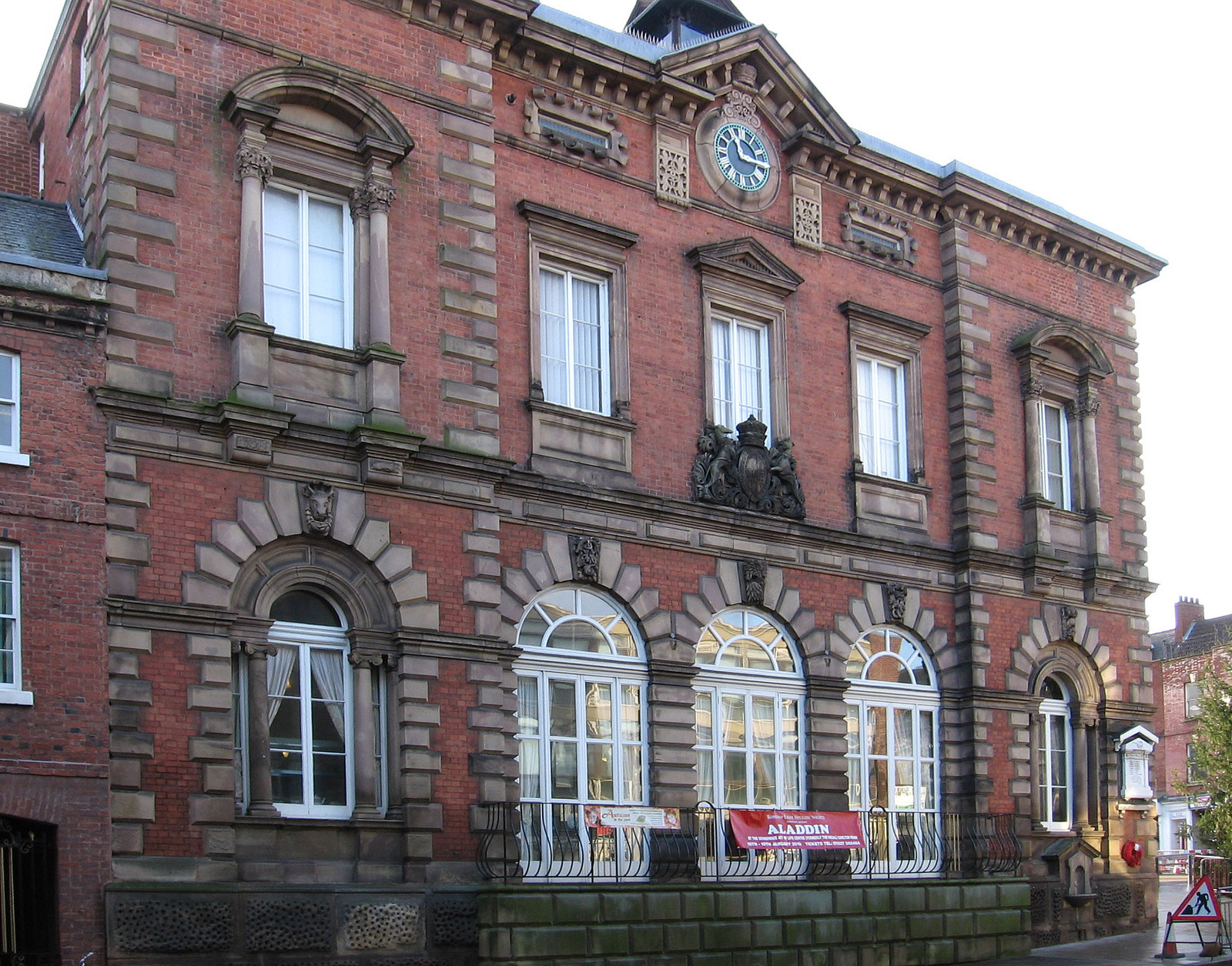
Former Corn Exchange, Worksop, 1851

Isaac Charles Gilbert (7 Jan 1822 – 4 March 1885) was an English architect based in Nottingham.

== Career ==
He was born in Kingston upon Hull in 1822, the son of Joseph Gilbert (1779–1852) a Congregational minister and his wife Ann (Taylor) (1782–1866) and baptised in Fish Street Independent Chapel, Kingston upon Hull on 22 January 1822.

He married Annie Gee (1829–1908) in St Nicholas' Church, Nottingham on 7 January 1851. They had the following children:

- Annie Laurie Gilbert (1851–1943)
- Jane Taylor Gilbert (1855–1937)
- Alice May Gilbert (1862–1932)
- Madeline Gilbert (1863–1946
- Charles Humphrey Gilbert (1865–1951)
- Isabel Gilbert (1867–1954)

He was architect of a number of Congregational chapels in various parts of the country.

He died on 4 March 1885 at Arthur Street, Nottingham and left an estate valued at £1,565 (equivalent to £173,900 in 2025).

== Notable works ==
- Congregational Chapel, Knutsford
- People’s College, College Street, Nottingham 1846
- Corn Exchange, Worksop (now Town Hall) 1851
- Ryecroft Independent (later Congregational) Chapel, Stockport Road, Ashton-under-Lyne 1852-53
- Sunday School, Ongar Congregational Chapel, Ongar 1865
- Cemetery Chapels, High Street, Ongar (joint architect with Watson Fothergill) 1866
