= Adam Carse =

English composer, academic, music writer and editor (1878–1958)

Adam Von Ahnen Carse (19 May 1878 – 2 November 1958) was an English composer, academic, music writer and editor, remembered today for his studies on the history of instruments and the orchestra, and for his educational music. His collection of around 350 antique wind instruments is now in the Horniman Museum.

== Life ==
Born in Newcastle upon Tyne, Carse received his first musical education in Hanover in 1893, and from 1894-1903 was a Macfarren scholar at the Royal Academy of Music, London where he studied composition with Frederick Corder. He received the 1902 medal from the Worshipful Company of Musicians, handed to the best student of the academy. He was assistant music master at Winchester College between 1909 and 1922, then returning to the Academy as Professor of Harmony and Counterpoint until 1940.

During and after the war Carse concentrated on writing and editing. His books (described in The Musical Times as "of first rate importance") include Musical Wind Instruments (1939), The Orchestra in the 18th Century (1940) and The Orchestra from Beethoven to Berlioz (1948), as well as a biography of the composer, conductor and showman Louis-Antoine Jullien, who established a concert series that was a forerunner to the Henry Wood Proms. He also specialised in editing early classical symphonies by composers such as Carl Friedrich Abel, Thomas Arne, J C Bach, Gossec and Stamitz.

Carse married Verena Muriel Fancourt Mutter, and their son Edward Adam Carse was born in June 1911. In February 1945 Edward was killed in action. Carse dedicated his Fifth Symphony, written in June 1945, to the memory of his son. In 1947 he donated his collection of 350 wind instruments to the Horniman Museum in South London, also in his son's memory: there is a plaque commemorating his gift in the Horniman Music Gallery.

Carse died in 1958 at his home – Winton, Martin's End Lane, Great Missenden, Buckinghamshire – aged eighty. His wife Verena died in 1966. Alongside the donated instruments at the Horniman is his personal library, containing research papers, manuscript notes, copies of lectures, correspondence, makers catalogues, sales lists and concert programmes.

== Music ==
According to Arthur Eaglefield Hull, Carse had "a pleasant and well finished style of writing, which concerns itself more with sound construction than original or atmospheric effects". Much of the material he wrote and arranged for school orchestras, young string players and pianists is still in use today. Among his educational piano works is the short Miniature Scherzo, which was chosen as one of ten test pieces for the Daily Express national piano playing competition in 1928, and recorded as a demonstration by William Murdoch.

Early orchestral works included a prelude to Byron's Manfred and two symphonic poems: The Death of Tintagiles (1902) and In a Balcony, (after Browning) the latter performed at the Proms on 26 August 1905. There was also a large-scale dramatic cantata setting Elizabeth Barrett Browning's The Lay of the Brown Rosary, for soloists, choir and orchestra, published in 1902. He wrote five symphonies, the second, in G minor, premiered by the orchestra of the Royal College of Music in London in November 1908 with the composer conducting, and the third (in F major, composed in 1927) was performed by the Bournemouth Municipal Orchestra on 20 April 1932 and broadcast from the Bournemouth Pavilion by the BBC.

His many works for strings included the Two Sketches, performed at the Proms on 4 September 1924, and the five movement Winton Suite of 1933, showing the influence of eighteenth century dance suites. Carse also wrote chamber music, including a Violin Sonata published in 1921 and the Miniature String Quartet in A minor, published in 1934. The seven Variations for Strings were composed as late as 1953 and broadcast by the BBC on 10 May 1954. For his compositions Carse occasionally used the name William Kent as an alias, and sometimes Adam Ahn-Carse.

== Books ==
- The History of Orchestration (1925)
- Musical Wind Instruments (1939)
- The Orchestra in the 18th Century (1940)
- The Orchestra from Beethoven to Berlioz (1948)
- 18th Century Symphonies (1951)
- The Life of Jullien (1951)

== Selected works ==
Orchestral and large ensemble

- Berceuse for strings (1946)
- The Death of Tintagiles, symphonic poem (1902)
- Festival March for strings
- Happy Heart Overture for orchestra
- Holiday Overture for orchestra
- In a Balcony, symphonic poem (1905)
- Lullaby and Dance for orchestra
- Manfred, orchestral prelude
- The Merry Milkmaids, orchestral suite for children (1922)
- Miniature Symphony for strings in D
- Northern Song for strings
- Norwegian Fantasia for violin and orchestra
- The Nursery, suite for orchestra (1928)
- Romance and Gavotte for strings
- Romantic Legend for orchestra (1938)
- Suite in C for strings (1925)
- Symphony No. 1 (1906)
- Symphony No. 2 (1908, rev. 1909)
- Symphony No. 3 (1927)
- Symphony No. 4
- Symphony No. 5
- Three Characteristic Pieces for brass band
- Three Dances for strings
- Three English Pictures for brass band
- Two Sketches for strings (1923)
- Variations in F for strings (1953)
- Variations on Barbara Allen for strings (1921)
- Waltz Variations for orchestra (1924)
- Winton Suite for strings

Chamber

- Childhood's Happy Days (a Toy Suite for piano and seven toy instruments)
- Fiddle Fancies
- Follow Your Leader, trio
- Miniature Scherzo for piano
- Miniature String Quartet in A minor (1934)
- Norwegian Folk Tunes, for piano
- Rondino, trio
- Scottish Tunes for piano (1916)
- Slow Wlatz, trio
- Suite in Old Style for violin and piano
- Terzetto for violin, viola and cello
- Three Legends for piano
- Trio in D minor for two violins and viola
- Two Easy Pieces for horn and piano (1939)
- Violin Sonata in C Minor (1922)

Vocal

- A Jewel Cycle, song cycle
- Judas Iscariot's Paradise, ballad for baritone, chorus and orchestra (1922)
- The Lay of the Brown Rosary, dramatic cantata for soloists, chorus and orchestra (1902)
- The Tide Rises, The Tide Falls, part song
