= William Wallace (Scottish composer) =

Scottish composer & ophthalmic surgeon (1860-1940)

William Wallace (3 July 1860 – 16 December 1940) was notable as a Scottish classical composer and writer. He served as Dean of the Faculty of Music in the University of London.

== Early life and education ==
Born at Greenock, Wallace studied ophthalmology at the University of Glasgow, and in Vienna and Paris. He became a qualified ophthalmic surgeon, but was also a poet, dramatist, writer on music and a painter.

In 1889 he entered the Royal Academy in London to study music with Alexander Mackenzie and Frederick Corder, but after two terms his father withdrew funding. This was the only formal training he had.

== Career ==
Wallace was greatly influenced by Franz Liszt, and was an early (though not the first) composer of symphonic poems in Britain. He was one of the composers featured in Granville Bantock's concert of new music by himself and his friends, put on at Queen's Hall on 15 December 1896, for which Wallace wrote a "manifesto". (Other composers included in this group were Erskine Allon, Arthur Hinton, Stanley Hawley and Reginald Steggall).

His compositions include the symphonic poem, Sir William Wallace (1905; based on his namesake, the freedom fighter William Wallace, one of Scotland's national heroes); a cantata, The Massacre of the Macpherson; and an overture, In Praise of Scottish Poesie (1894). He also wrote a Creation Symphony (1899), influenced by numerology. He was inspired by Maurice Maeterlinck's play, Pelléas and Mélisande, to write music by the same name.

Wallace wrote several books on music, including the following:

- The Threshold of Music: An Inquiry into the Development of the Musical Sense (1908);
- The Musical Faculty (1914);
- Richard Wagner as he lived (1925)
- Liszt, Wagner and the Princess (1927)

He served as secretary of the Royal Philharmonic Society from 1911 to 1913, during which time the society received its royal appointment. Wallace later served as Dean of the Faculty of Music in the University of London. He would frequently use the Hebrew letter shin in his artwork, due to its resemblance to a W.

During the First World War, he served as inspector of ophthalmic units in Eastern Command, at the rank of captain.

In the late 20th century, there was a revival of interest in his work. The BBC Scottish Symphony Orchestra recorded several of his orchestral pieces on the Hyperion record label.

== Personal life ==
Wallace's wife was the sculptor Ottilie Maclaren Wallace. They met in the 1890s and became secretly engaged in 1896, but were unable to marry until 11 April 1905. Their letters to each other are held at the National Library in Edinburgh.

== Compositions (selective list) ==
=== Orchestral ===
- 1891 – An American Rhapsody
- 1891 – A Scots Fantasy
- 1891–92 – Suite in A, The Lady of the Sea (fp. Stock Exchange Orchestral Society, London, 18 February 1892)
- 1892 – The Passing of Beatrice, symphonic poem [No.1] (fp. Crystal Palace, London, 26 November 1892)
- 1893 – Prelude to The Eumenides (fp. Crystal Palace, London, 21 October 1893)
- 1894 – In Praise of Scottish Poesie, concert overture (fp. Crystal Palace, London, 17 November 1894)
- 1896 – Amboss oder Hammer, symphonic poem [No.2] (fp. Crystal Palace, London, 17 October 1896) (lost)
- 1898 – Asperges, symphonic poem (unfinished)
- 1898 – The Covenanters, symphonic poem (unfinished)
- 1898 – The Forty-Five, symphonic poem (unfinished)
- 1896–99 – The Creation, symphony (fp. The Tower, New Brighton, 30 July 1899)
- 1899 – Sister Helen, symphonic poem [No.3] (fp. Crystal Palace, London, 25 February 1899)
- 1900–01 – Greeting to the New Century, symphonic poem [No.4] (fp. Queen's Hall, London, 27 March 1901)
- 1905 – William Wallace AD 1305–1905, symphonic poem [No.5] (fp. Queen's Hall, London, 19 September 1905)
- 1909 – Villon, symphonic poem [No.6] (fp. Queen's Hall, London, 10 March 1909)
- Annie Laurie

=== Choral and vocal ===
- 1886–88 – A Festival Mass, for chorus and orchestra
- 1890 – Lord of Darkness, scena for baritone and orchestra (fp. Royal Academy of Music, London, 1890)
- 1896 – The Rhapsody of Mary Magdalen, for soprano and orchestra (fp. Queen's Hall, London, 15 December 1896)
- 1899 – Freebooter Songs, for baritone and orchestra (fp. The Tower, New Brighton, 30 July 1899)
- 1900 – Jacobite Songs, for voice and orchestra
- 1908 – The Outlaw, ballad for baritone, (optional) male chorus and orchestra
- 1910 – The Massacre of the Macpherson, burlesque ballad for male chorus and orchestra (fp. Leeds Musical Union, 1910)
- Keholeth, symphony for chorus and orchestra (unfinished)

=== Operatic ===
- 1896 – Brassolis, lyrical tragedy in one act

=== Incidental music ===
- 1896 – Romeo and Juliet
- 1897 – Pelléas et Mélisande (suite fp. at The Tower, New Brighton, 19 August 1900)

== Recordings ==
- Creation Symphony in C# minor,Pelléas and Mélisande Suite, Prelude to The Eumenides. Hyperion (Helios) CDH55465
- Symphonic Poems, No 1 (Passing of Beatrice), 3 (Sister Helen), 5 (Sir William Wallace) and 6 (Villon). Hyperion (Helios) CDH55461 (1996)
